The use of electronic cigarettes (vaping) carries health risks. The risk depends on the fluid and varies according to design and user behavior. In the United Kingdom, vaping is considered by some to be around 95% less harmful than tobacco after a controversial landmark review by Public Health England.

E-cigarettes reduce lung function, reduce cardiac muscle function, and increase inflammation. Traditional cigarettes have a higher damage record than vaping. The deadly 2019–20 vaping lung illness outbreak in North America was strongly linked to vitamin E acetate in THC-containing vaping liquid.  Nicotine vaping produces more carcinogens and toxic substances than a medically approved nicotine inhaler.

There are also risks from misuse or accidents. Such accidents can be through nicotine poisoning (especially among small children), contact with liquid nicotine, and fires caused by vaporizer malfunction.

Methodological issues
The long-term consequences from e-cigarette use on death and disease are unclear. There is little data about safety, and considerable variation among e-cigarettes and the liquid ingredients.

Alternatives to smoking

Electronic cigarettes have been proposed as a healthier alternative for people who otherwise cannot or choose not to quit smoking, even if complete abstinence is the healthiest option. In June 2014, the Royal College of Physicians stated that, "On the basis of available evidence, the RCP believes that e-cigarettes could lead to significant falls in the prevalence of smoking in the UK, prevent many deaths and episodes of serious illness, and help to reduce the social inequalities in health that tobacco smoking currently exacerbates." Vapor does not contain tobacco and does not involve combustion, therefore users may avoid several harmful constituents usually found in tobacco smoke, such as ash, tar, and carbon monoxide. A 2014 review found that e-cigarette aerosol contains far fewer carcinogens than tobacco smoke, and concluded that e-cigarettes "impart a lower potential disease burden" than traditional cigarettes. The public health community is divided over how the use of these devices will impact the tobacco epidemic. Some tobacco control advocates predict that e-cigarettes will increase rates of cigarette uptake, especially among youth. Others envision that these devices have potential for aiding cessation efforts, or reducing harm among people who continue to smoke. Scientific studies advocate caution before designating e-cigarettes as beneficial but vapers continue to believe they are beneficial. It is estimated their safety risk is similar to that of smokeless tobacco, which has about 1% of the mortality risk of traditional cigarettes. The risk of early death is anticipated to be similar to that of smokeless tobacco.

Public health authorities are concerned that electronic cigarettes may increase overall nicotine exposure for young people and increase use of burned tobacco products among young and older people by acting as a gateway drug for non-smokers and sustaining or restarting nicotine addiction among smokers and former smokers, respectively.
, no long-term studies have evaluated future tobacco use as a result of e-cigarette use. E-cigarette vapor potentially contains harmful substances not found in tobacco smoke. A study conducted found that people using electronic cigerattes go through more nicotrine than traditional tobacco users.

Opinions that e-cigarettes are a safe substitute to traditional cigarettes may compromise tobacco control efforts.
The American Cancer Society stated, "The makers of e-cigarettes say that the ingredients are "safe," but this only means the ingredients have been found to be safe to eat. Inhaling a substance is not the same as swallowing it. There are questions about how safe it is to inhale some substances in the e-cigarette vapor into the lungs."
The Canadian Cancer Society has stated that, "A few studies have shown that there may be low levels of harmful substances in some e-cigarettes, even if they don't have nicotine."
In the UK a National Institute for Health and Care Excellence (NICE) guideline did not recommend e-cigarettes as there are questions regarding the safety, efficacy, and quality of these products.

Because the devices are relatively new, long-term data showing whether vaping is a "healthier alternative" to cigarette smoking does not exist.

Effects on increasing nicotine products 
A concern regarding vaping is that it could entice children to initiate smoking. This could be the argument that nicotine leads to smoking or making smoking appear more acceptable again. Concerns exist in respect to adolescence vaping due to studies indicating nicotine may potentially have harmful effects on the growing brain.

The medical community is concerned that increased availability of e-cigarettes could increase worldwide nicotine dependence, especially among the young as they are enticed by the various flavor options e-cigarettes have to offer. Vaping does not produce smoke from burning tobacco, therefore opponents of e-cigarettes fear that traditional smokers will substitute vaping for smoking in settings where smoking is not permitted without any real intention of quitting traditional cigarettes. Furthermore, vaping in public places, coupled with recent e-cigarette commercials on national television, could possibly undermine or weaken current antismoking regulations. Fear exists that wide-scale promotion and use of e-cigarettes, fueled by an increase in advertising of these products, may carry substantial public health risks. Public health professionals voiced concerns regarding vaping while using other tobacco products - particularly combustible products. The entrance of large US tobacco manufacturers (Altria Group, Reynolds American, and Lorillard), into the e-cigarette sector raises many potential public health issues. Instead of encouraging quitting, the tobacco industry markets e-cigarettes as a way to get around clean indoor air laws, which promotes dual use. The industry could also lead vapers to tobacco products, which would increase overall addiction. With that, the emergence of e-cigarettes may benefit Big Tobacco to sustain an industry for tobacco. A 2017 review states that the "Increased concentration of the ENDS market in the hands of the transnational tobacco companies is concerning to the public health community, given the industry's legacy of obfuscating many fundamental truths about their products and misleading the public with false claims, including that low-tar and so-called "light" cigarettes would reduce the harms associated with smoking. Although industry representatives are claiming interest in ENDS because of their harm-reduction potential, many observers believe that profit remains the dominant motivation." E-cigarettes are expanding the tobacco epidemic by bringing lower-risk youth into the market, many of whom then transition to smoking cigarettes.

Effects on smoking cessation
There is concern that e-cigarettes may result in smokers rejecting historically effective quitting smoking methods. Majority of smokers attempting to quit by vaping may stop smoking but maintain nicotine intake because their long-term effects are not clear. Since e-cigarettes are intended to be used repeatedly, they can conveniently be used for an extended period of time, which may contribute to increased consumption.

Frequently reported less harmful effects of vaping compared to smoking were reduced shortness of breath, reduced cough, reduced spitting, and reduced sore throat. Many health benefits are associated with switching from tobacco products to e-cigarettes including decreased weight gain after smoking cessation and improved exercise tolerance. Vaping is possibly harmful by virtue of putting off quitting smoking, serving as a gateway to tobacco use in never-smokers or causing a return to smoking in former smokers. Many e-cigarette users cite a desire to quit smoking as a primary reason for use but there is not clear evidence that e-cigarettes help people quit smoking entirely, although they may help smokers reduce the number of cigarettes they smoke. There is some evidence that the usage of electronic cigarettes with nicotine increases quit rates compared to electronic cigarettes without nicotine and compared to nicotine replacement therapy. The size of the effect (i.e. how effective the electronic cigarettes are compared to the other options) is not known. Some frequently use both, exposing themselves to both the harms of tobacco smoking and the possible harms of e-cigarette use.

Vaping can hinder smokers from trying to quit, resulting in increased tobacco use and associated health problems. Quitting smoking entirely would likely have much greater beneficial effects to overall health than vaping to decrease the number of cigarettes smoked. A 2017 review found "Because the brain does not reach full maturity until the mid-20s, restricting sales of electronic cigarettes and all tobacco products to individuals aged at least 21 years and older could have positive health benefits for adolescents and young adults." Adverse effects to the health of children is mostly not known. E-cigarettes are a source of potential developmental toxicants. Children subjected to e-cigarettes had a higher likelihood of having more than one adverse effect and those were more significant than with children subjected to traditional cigarettes. Significant harmful effects were cyanosis, nausea, and coma, among others.

More serious adverse effects, such as depression, insomnia, and anxiety, are frequently related with smoking use. A study was conducted which concluded that a primary reason most vape user quit is due to health (75%), cost (45%), and to reduce risk of COVID-19 (24%). Methods most users used to quit vaping were by cutting (68%), getting advice from doctors (28%), quitting 'cold turkey' (24%), nicotine, or switching to E-cigarette  with less nicotine (24%).

E-cigarettes were associated with fewer adverse effects than nicotine patches.
Contact dermatitis from nickel exposure has been reported, following e-cigarette use.

Overall risk relative to smoking
The degree of relative safety of the same amount of use of electronic versus conventional cigarettes is disputed. 2015 and 2018 Public Health England (PHE) reports claimed that vaping is "at least 95% less harmful than smoking", while pointing out that this does not mean vaping is safe. This claim has been widely repeated, including by the Royal College of Physicians, the Royal Society for Public Health, and the National Health Service. The original paper making the claim pointed out that the accuracy of the estimate was limited by "lack of hard evidence for the harms of most products on most of the criteria". The group that produced the estimate in a 2014 meeting was funded by EuroSwiss Health and has been criticized as using a weak methodology, not citing specific evidence, and for 
having financial ties to the tobacco industry.

The estimate has been extensively disputed in medical journals. Many have criticized the validity of the estimate that vaping is 95% less harmful than smoking. Some researchers claim in more recent papers that the harm from electronic cigarettes is known to be much higher than the "95% safer" figure.

A government review by Public Health England found that e-cigarettes sold in England (which are regulated to a nicotine strength of no more than 20 mg/ml) are unlikely to exceed 5% of the harm of cigarettes for non-pregnant adults. This claim is consistent with the view of the National Academies of Sciences, Engineering, and Medicine of the United States, which argues that e-cigarettes are not without risk, but compared to combustible tobacco cigarettes, they contain fewer toxicants. Furthermore, e-cigarette is not only a harm reduction alternative to smoking; but it is also a smoking cessation product, to the same extent of other Food and Drug Administration-approved nicotine replacement therapies.

Regulation 

Guidelines for the design, manufacture and assessment of the safety of e-cigarette devices has not been established.
A 2015 review suggested that e-cigarettes could be regulated in a similar way as inhalation therapeutic medicine, meaning they were regulated based on toxicology and safety clinical trials.

A 2014 review recommended that e-cigarettes could be adequately regulated for consumer safety with existing regulations on the design of electronic products. Regulation of the production and promotion of e-cigarettes may help lower some of the adverse effects associated with tobacco use.

E-cigarette devices are not required to disclose the level of nicotine provided, nor the other chemicals they contain, being difficult for consumers to assess the safety of the product.

Suction 
Vaping requires more forceful sucking than smoking, and this action is still unclear on increased absorption of harmful substances and the user's health. Sucking more forcefully from e-cigarette use may be adverse to human health.

Adverse effects 

Battery explosions are caused by an increase in internal battery temperature and some have resulted in severe skin burns. There is a small risk of battery explosion in devices modified to increase battery power. Nicotine poisoning related to e-cigarettes can occur by ingestion, inhalation, or absorption via the skin or eyes. Accidental poisoning can result from using undiluted concentrated nicotine when mistakenly used as prepared e-liquid. There is possibility that inhalation, ingestion, or skin contact can expose people to high levels of nicotine. Concerns with exposure to the e-liquids include leaks or spills and contact with contaminants in the e-liquid. Pregnant women, breastfeeding mothers, and the elderly are more sensitive to nicotine than other individuals. There are safety issues with the nicotine exposure from e-cigarette use, which may cause addiction and other adverse effects.
There is considerable variation among e-cigarettes and in their liquid ingredients and thus the contents of the aerosol delivered to the user.  The cytotoxicity of e-liquids varies, and contamination with various chemicals have been detected in the liquid. E-cigarette vapor potentially contains harmful chemicals which are not found in tobacco smoke.

Studies over a year on the effects of exposure to e-cigarettes have not been conducted, as of 2019. The risk from serious adverse events, including death, was reported in 2016 to be low. The long-term health consequences from vaping is likely greater than nicotine replacement products. They may produce fewer adverse effects compared to tobacco products. They may cause long-term and short-term adverse effects, including airway resistance, irritation of the airways, eyes redness, and dry throat.  Short-term adverse effects reported most often were mouth and throat irritation, dry cough, and nausea.

Adverse effects are mostly associated with short-term use and the reported adverse effects decreased over time. Dryness of the mouth and throat is believed to stem from the ability of both propylene glycol and glycerin to absorb water. Some e-cigarettes users experience adverse effects like throat irritation which could be the result of exposure to nicotine, nicotine solvents, or toxicants in the aerosol. Vaping may harm neurons and trigger tremors and spasms.
The use of e-cigarettes has been found associated with nose bleeding, change in bronchial gene expression, release of cytokines and proinflammatory mediators, and increase in allergic airway inflammation which can exacerbate asthmatic symptoms, thus elevating infiltration of inflammatory cells including eosinophils into airways.
A 2016 study found vaping using an e-liquid containing 23% alcohol was linked to reduced performance on the Purdue Pegboard Test.

Reports to the FDA in 2013 for minor adverse effects identified with using e-cigarettes included headache, chest pain, nausea, and cough. Major adverse events reported to the FDA in 2013 included hospitalizations for pneumonia, congestive heart failure, seizure, rapid heart rate, and burns. However, no direct relationship has been proven between these events and e-cigarette use, and some may be due to existing health problems.
Many of the observed negative effects from e-cigarette use concerning the nervous system and the sensory system are possibly related to nicotine overdose or withdrawal.

Battery-related malfunctions 
Most e-cigarettes use lithium batteries, the improper use of which may result in accidents. Most fires caused by vaporing devices are a result of the lithium batteries becoming too hot and igniting. Defective e-cigarette batteries have been known to cause fires and explosions. The chance of an e-cigarette blast resulting in burns and projectile harms greatly rises when using low-quality batteries, if stored incorrectly or was altered by the user. Inexpensive manufacturing with poor quality control could account for some of the explosions. It has been recommended that manufacturing quality standards be imposed in order to prevent such accidents. Better product design and standards could probably reduce some of the risks. It is recommended that users be informed of appropriate charging and storage methods. In the event the lithium ion substances leak from the battery as a result of an e-cigarette blast, first aid is recommended to prevent additional chemical reaction. An e-cigarette blast can induce serious burns and harms that need thorough and lengthy medical treatment particularly when a device goes off in hands, mouths, or pockets. A 2017 review found "The electrolyte liquid within the lithium ion battery cells is at risk for overheating, thus building pressure that may exceed the capacity of the battery casing. This "thermal runaway" can ultimately result in cell rupture or combustion." Metal objects, including coins or keys, can cause a short circuit when kept with batteries, which can result in overheating of the battery. It is recommended to use insulated protective cases for batteries not in use to lessen the potential risk related to thermal runaway. Swallowing e-cigarette batteries can be toxic.

The numbers of medical reports from harms resulting from vaping have continued to increase since 2016. Some batteries are not well designed, are made with poor quality components, or have defects. Major injuries have occurred from battery explosions and fires. Fires caused by e-cigarettes appear to be increasingly frequent. Direct harms from an e-cigarette blast include hand harms, face harms, waist/groin harms, and inhalation harms. Indirect harms happened when the vaporing device set on fire another object and resulted in a house fire, followed by harm from fire burns or inhalation. E-cigarette explosions have resulted in burns, lost teeth, neck fractures, and battery acid contact to the face, mouth, and eyes. The extent of the burns varied from 1% to 8% total body surface area, were reported and most commonly occurred in the lower extremity, hands, head and neck, and genitalia. The extent of the burn was mainly deep partial and full thickness. E-cigarette explosion harms correlated with malfunctioning of the device can result in minor total body surface area 2nd and 3rd degree burns. Around 50% needed surgical management for the burn. This was due to the extent of the injury. The most common harms are burns as a result of explosion in the pocket and harms to the face. A 2017 review found "Several of the reported cases show that 'the battery in pocket' precedes the incident. The damp environment in the pocket may have sufficient moisture to start a chemical reaction within the lithium-ion battery and the presence of metal objects can produce short-circuit which can over heat the battery leading to an explosion." Flame burns, chemical burns, and blast injuries have occurred as a result of the e-cigarette battery overheating. A man endured a unilateral corneoscleral laceration with prolapsed iris tissue and hyphemato to the eye area when an e-cigarette exploded in his mouth. A young man endured bilateral corneal burns to the eye area when an e-cigarette exploded near his chest. A man died when his charging e-cigarette blew up and caught on fire next to oxygen equipment. House and car fires and skin burns have resulted from some of the explosions. The explosions were the result of extended charging, use of unsuitable chargers, or design flaws. There is a possible risk to bystanders from e-cigarette explosions. There is also a risk of property damage as a result of flammable materials catching on fire from an e-cigarette explosion. A March 2016 research article assembled reports by US government agencies and in the media of 92 e-cigarette blasts, fire, or overheating events, with related injuries in 47 individuals. Prominent harms included 2 cervical vertebral fractures, 1 palate fracture, 3 instances of damaged teeth, 33 thermal burns, 4 chemical burns, and 5 lacerations.

Between January 2015 and May 2016, 35 burns and correlated injuries were caused by e-cigarette explosions. Between January 2009 and December 31, 2016, 195 separate incidents of explosion and fire involving an e-cigarette were reported by the US media. These incidents resulted in 133 acute injuries. Of these injuries, 38 (29 percent) were severe. Sixty-one incidents occurred when either the device or spare batteries for the device were in a pocket. Sixty incidents occurred while the device was being used. Forty-eight incidents occurred while the battery in the device was being charged. Eighteen incidents occurred while the device or battery was stored. In seven incidents, it is not reported whether the e-cigarette was in use, stored, or being charged. One incident occurred during transportation on a cargo aircraft. Media reports generally characterize these incidents as explosions. While there is generally a brief period of overheating and off-gassing at the onset of the event, the events tend to occur suddenly, and are accompanied by loud noise, a flash of light, smoke, flames, and often vigorous ejection of the battery and other parts. A number of the media reports state that the battery or other components of the device were ejected under pressure and "flew across the room," often igniting combustible items where they landed.

The United States Fire Administration stated in 2014 that 25 fires and explosions in the US were caused by e-cigarettes between 2009 and August 2014. This list is not considered to be complete because it is very possible that there were events that were not disclosed to the fire department or mentioned in the media. Up to 2014, twenty events happened when charging the battery in the e-cigarette. Two events happened during use. In two events, it is unclear whether the device was in use, not in use or was charging. One event happened while being transported on a cargo aircraft. Several burns were reported. Two serious harms were the result of devices exploding in users' mouths. A 2017 review found that "The U.S. Fire Administration reports that 80% of e-cigarette explosions occurred while the battery was being charged. The report revealed that many of the e-cigarettes were being charged by power adaptors that were not provided by the manufacturer, subjecting the battery to an inappropriately high current, which led to thermal runaway and subsequent explosion and/or fire. This problem is potentially further exacerbated by third-party vendors who assemble e-cigarettes from noncompatible parts that may not meet the manufacturers' specifications." The shape of these devices is another concern. They are likely to be cylindrical, with the least strongest structural points at both ends. In the event there is a breach in the battery seal, the pressure inside the e-cigarette can quickly build, launching the ends of the device with a great abundance of force.

The United States Fire Administration stated in 2017 that of the reported fire and explosion incidents involving e-cigarettes, 128 (66 percent) resulted in ignition of nearby contents such as clothing, carpets, drapes, bedding, couches, or vehicle seats. Users were generally nearby when the incident occurred, were alerted by the sound of the explosion, and were able to take action to extinguish the fires while they were still small. In 91 incidents, the fire spread was minor, meaning that the scorching or flames either self-extinguished or were extinguished very quickly by persons nearby. Typically, in these incidents, the burned areas were 6 inches or less in diameter. In 27 incidents, the fire spread was moderate, where the burned area was larger than 6 inches in diameter, but the fire was extinguished by occupants before the fire department arrived. In 10 incidents, the fire spread was major and involved significant portions of a building, and required suppression by the fire department. Typically, these incidents are what the fire service refers to as "room and contents" type fires, or larger. In 67 of the incidents (34 percent), there was no fire spread, or fire spread was not evident in the reports reviewed.

Even though there are knowns risks with unregulated lithium batteries causing serious harm, importing e-cigarettes to the UK is still not restricted and they do not conform to the British Standards, which may increase their chance of resulting in fire and blowing up. There has been a rise in the number of burns due to blasts of the e-cigarettes battery in South Wales and South West England. In the UK fire service call-outs had risen, from 43 in 2013 to 62 in 2014. A 2015 PHE report concluded that the risks of fire from e-cigarettes "appear to be comparable to similar electrical goods". A 2018 PHE report found six case studies involving e-cigarettes with burns in the UK. Every person were male and 33 years was the average age. In five cases, they received burn harms resulting from an e-cigarette blast in their pants pocket. One case happened while coins and the e-cigarette were in the same pocket. Another case happened when the e-cigarette was being charged. Harms included burns accounting for 1–7% of the complete body surface region. Harms happened to the thigh, genitals, foot, and hands. Chemical burns from the battery was included in one case. Since e-cigarettes are not subjected to product safety testing, they may not have safety designs to avoid overheating, thermal runaway, and battery failure including fire and explosions. There is inadequate product labeling to inform users of the possible serious harms. The risk from serious adverse events was reported in 2016 to be low, but the aftermath may be disastrous in respect to an e-cigarette blast. Numerous stories about the e-cigarette blasts were reported in the news media and victims have filed lawsuits to make restitution from the blasts. Adverse events may be under-reported because reports to the FDA is voluntary.

In January 2015 the US Federal Aviation Administration issued a safety alert to air carriers that e-cigarettes should not be allowed in checked baggage after a review of fire safety issues, including two fires caused by e-cigarettes in checked baggage. The International Civil Aviation Organization, a United Nations agency, also recommends prohibiting e-cigarettes in checked luggage. A spokesman for the Tobacco Vapor Electronic Cigarette Association said that e-cigarettes do not pose a problem if they are packed correctly in static-free packaging, but that irresponsible people may sometimes pack them carelessly or tamper with them. In 2015 the US Department of Transportation prohibited storage of e-cigarettes in checked baggage on airplanes to avoid damage and injury due to an explosion. In-flight use of e-cigarettes is prohibited in the US. A 2017 review stated "Passengers are allowed to carry e-cigarettes with them onto planes, but are not allowed to charge their batteries during flight."

Individuals sent to Saint Louis Hospital Burn Center in Paris, France from June 2016 to July 2017 for harms resulting from e-cigarettes were ten. Four individuals were admitted to the hospital and six of them received care at an Outpatient Burn Clinic. All of them had burns of at least one arm or leg. In 2014 a 72-year-old male with pulmonary fibrosis was hospitalized for 5 days at the Maisonneuve-Rosemont Hospital in Montreal with facial burns that happened after his nasal prongs caught on fire from using an e-cigarette while on oxygen therapy. Several burn events during vaping while on home oxygen therapy have happened, leading Health Canada in 2014 to release a warning of fire risk to oxygen therapy users from vaping. The heating element in vaping devices reaches a high temperature which can possibly ignite in the presence of oxygen. Vaping while on oxygen therapy is not recommended.

E-cigarette-related fires and explosions are a new risk to people and pets. In 2016, the FDA Center for Tobacco Products reviewed and summarized reports from other US government agencies, the news media, and scientific articles about e-cigarette-related fires and explosions, finding that some events have resulted in life-threatening injury, and permanent disfigurement or disability. Although there were no reports of pets being injured, the risk still exists. Pets that chew on the devices may potentially puncture the cartridges or batteries, or they may inadvertently turn on the devices. The US Food and Drug Administration recommends to keep e-cigarettes and all other tobacco products out of reach of children and pets at all times.

Users may alter many of the devices, such as using them to administer other drugs like cannabis. E-liquid mixing is another way users tamper with e-cigarettes. Mixing liquid in an unclean area runs the risk of contamination. Users may add various flavorings and diluents. Vodka or other forms of alcohol may also be added. The addition of alcohol or nicotine could expose the user to more toxicants, especially when added in combinations. Some ingredients in e-liquids could be flammable; this risk is more of concern for users who are inexperienced or do not use protective gear. Users can adjust the voltage of some e-cigarettes. The amount of vapor produced is controlled by the power of the battery, which has led some users to adjust their e-cigarettes to increase battery power to obtain a stronger nicotine "hit", but there is a small risk of battery explosion. Some users add more or larger batteries to nonadjustable e-cigarettes, which may lead to battery leakage or explosion. The FDA stated to only use batteries recommended for use with the device. The FDA recommended to replace the batteries if they get damaged or wet. The extent to which teens are altering e-cigarettes, such as dripping the liquids onto the atomizer to get more nicotine intake, is not known.

Poisoning 

Nicotine poisoning related to e-cigarettes include ingestion, inhalation, or absorption via the skin or eyes. Accidental poisoning can result from using undiluted concentrated nicotine when mistakenly used as prepared e-liquids. E-cigarettes involve accidental nicotine exposure in children. Accidental exposures in pediatric patients include ingesting e-liquids and inhaling e-cigarette vapors. Choking on e-cigarette components is a potential risk. In 2014, an infant died from choking on an e-cigarette component. It is recommended that youth access to e-cigarettes be prohibited. Concerns exist regarding poisoning, considering the variety of flavors may appeal to children, as well as adolescents seeing the colorful bottles as candy.

The e-liquid can be toxic if swallowed, especially among small children. Four adults died in the US and Europe, after intentionally ingesting liquid. Two children, one in the US in 2014 and another in Israel in 2013, died after ingesting liquid nicotine. A two-year-old girl in the UK in 2014 was hospitalized after licking an e-cigarette liquid refill. Death from accidental nicotine poisoning is very uncommon.

Calls to US poison control centers related to e-cigarette exposures involved inhalations, eye exposures, skin exposures, and ingestion, in both adults and young children. Minor, moderate, and serious adverse effects involved adults and young children. Minor effects correlated with e-cigarette liquid poisoning were tachycardia, tremor, chest pain and hypertension. More serious effects were bradycardia, hypotension, nausea, respiratory paralysis, atrial fibrillation and dyspnea. The exact correlation is not fully known between these effects and e-cigarettes. The initial symptoms of nicotine poisoning may include rapid heart rate, sweating, feeling sick, and throwing up, and delayed symptoms include low blood pressure, seizures, and hypoventilation. Rare serious effects included coma, seizure, trouble breathing, and heart attack. Since June 2018, the US FDA observed a slight but noticeable increase in reports of seizures. After examining poison control centers' reports between 2010 and early 2019, the FDA determined that, between the poison control centers and the US FDA, there were a total of 35 reported cases of seizures mentioning use of e-cigarettes within that timeframe. Due to the voluntary nature of these case reports, there may be more instances of seizure in e-cigarette users than have been reported.

Since 2011, accidental poisoning from e-liquids that contain nicotine have grown rapidly in the US. From September 1, 2010, to December 31, 2014, 58% of e-cigarette calls to US poison control centers were related to children 5 years old or less. Exposures for children below the age of 6 is a concern because a small dose of nicotine e-liquid may be fatal. A 2014 Centers for Disease Control and Prevention report found 51.1% of the calls to US poison centers due to e-cigarettes were related to children under age 5, and about 42% of the US poison center calls were related to people age 20 and older. E-cigarette calls had a greater chance to report an adverse effect and a greater chance to report a moderate or major adverse effect than traditional cigarette calls. Most of the e-cigarette and traditional cigarette calls were a minor effect. Severe outcomes were more than 2.5 times more frequent in children exposed to e-cigarettes and nicotine e-liquid than with traditional cigarettes. E-cigarette sales were roughly equivalent to just 3.5% of traditional cigarette sales, but e-cigarettes represented 44% of the total number of e-cigarette and traditional cigarette calls to US poison control centers in December 2014.

The US poison control centers reported 92.5% of children coming in contact with liquid nicotine was from swallowing during the period from January 2012 to April 2017. From September 1, 2010, to December 31, 2014, the most frequent adverse effects to e-cigarettes and e-liquid reported to US poison control centers were: Ingestion exposure resulted in vomiting, nausea, drowsy, tachycardia, or agitation; inhalation/nasal exposure resulted in nausea, vomiting, dizziness, agitated, or headache; ocular exposure resulted in eye irritation or pain, red eye or conjunctivitis, blurred vision, headache, or corneal abrasion; multiple routes of exposure resulted in eye irritation or pain, vomiting, red eye or conjunctivitis, nausea, or cough; and dermal exposure that resulted in nausea, dizziness, vomiting, headache, or tachycardia. The ten most frequent adverse effects to e-cigarettes and e-liquid reported to US poison control centers were vomiting (40.4%), eye irritation or pain (20.3%), nausea (16.8%), red eye or conjunctivitis (10.5%), dizziness (7.5%), tachycardia (7.1%), drowsiness (7.1%), agitation (6.3%), headache (4.8%), and cough (4.5%). In nine reported calls, exposed individuals stated the device leaked. In five reported calls, individuals used e-liquid for their eyes rather than use eye drops. In one reported call, an infant was given the e-liquid by an adult who thought it was the infant's medication. There were also reports of choking on e-cigarette components.

From January 1, 2016, and April 30, 2016, the American Association of Poison Control Centers (AAPCC) reported 623 exposures related to e-cigarettes.  In 2016 AAPCC reported there were a total of 2,907 exposures regarding e-cigarettes and liquid nicotine. The yearly nicotine exposure rate in the US involving children went up by 1398.2% from 2012 to 2015, and later dropped by 19.8% from 2015 to 2016. The AAPCC reported 3,067 exposures relating to e-cigarettes and liquid nicotine in 2015, and 3,783 in 2014. As of October 31, 2018, there were a total of 2,555 exposures regarding e-cigarettes and liquid nicotine in 2018. The US National Poison Control database showed that in 2015 more than 1000 needed medical attention from being exposed to nicotine e-liquid. Most exposures in 2015 were related to children under the age of 5. The reported e-cigarette poisonings to medical centres in the UK most often happen in children under the age of five. Toxic effects for children under the age of five in the UK are typically short in length and not severe. From September 1, 2010, to December 31, 2014, there were at least 5,970 e-cigarette calls to US poison control centers. Calls to US poison control centers related to e-cigarettes increased between September 2010 to February 2014, and of the total number of cigarettes and e-cigarettes calls, e-cigarette calls increased from 0.3% to 41.7%. Calls to US poison controls centers related to e-cigarette liquid poisoning increased from 1 in September 2010 to 215 for the month of February 2014. E-cigarette calls was 401 for the month of April 2014. The National Poison Data System stated that exposures to e-cigarettes and liquid nicotine among young children is rising significantly. The California Poison Control System reported 35 cases of e-cigarette contact from 2010 to 2012, 14 were in children and 25 were from accidental contact. Calls associated with e-cigarette poisoning in Texas found that 57% was associated with children under the age of 5. They were accidental, and in 96% of cases occurred where they lived. Of these, 85% were from swallowing, and 11% from skin contact.

In 2017, the US Food and Drug Administration states that the e-cigarette aerosol can cause problems for the user and their pets. Some studies have shown that the aerosol made by these devices may expose the user and, therefore, their pets to higher-than-normal amounts of nicotine and other toxic chemicals, like formaldehyde. E-cigarettes use capsules that can contain nicotine. Some of these capsules can be re-filled using a special liquid. Sometimes, pets—mainly dogs—find the capsules and bite them or get into the liquid refilling solution. In a March 15, 2016, letter to the editor of the Journal of the American Veterinary Medical Association, the Texas Poison Center Network reported 11 cases of dogs being exposed to e-cigarettes or refills. Moreover, there is no antidote for nicotine poisoning. If someone's pet gets into an e-cigarette, nicotine capsule, or the liquid refilling solution, it is an emergency, according to the FDA. Get him or her to the veterinarian or to a veterinary emergency clinic as quickly as possible, according to the FDA. The Animal Poison Control Center states that all the nicotine toxicity cases in 2012 included 4.6% of e-cigarettes causes and it increased to 13.6% in 2013.

Second-hand exposure 
After the aerosol is inhaled, it is exhaled. Emissions from e-cigarettes are not comparable to environmental pollution or cigarette smoke as their nature and chemical composition are completely different. The particles are larger, with the mean size being 600 nm in inhaled aerosol and 300 nm in exhaled aerosol. The exhaled aerosol particle concentration is 5 times lower from an e-cigarette than from a traditional cigarette. The density of particles in the e-cigarette vapor is lower than in cigarette smoke by a factor of between 6 and 880 times lower.

For particulate matter emissions, e-cigarettes slightly exceeded the WHO guidelines, but emissions were 15 times less than traditional cigarette use. In January 2014, the International Union Against Tuberculosis and Lung Disease stated "Adverse health effects for exposed third parties (second-hand exposure) cannot be excluded because the use of electronic cigarettes leads to emission of fine and ultrafine inhalable liquid particles, nicotine and cancer-causing substances into indoor air." The dense vapor consists of liquid sub-micron droplets. Substantial levels of particulate matter with a diameter of 2.5 μm are exhaled by vapers.

Since e-cigarettes have not been widely used long enough for evaluation, the long-term health effects from the second-hand vapor are not known. The short-term health effects from the second-hand vapor is also not known. There is insufficient data to determine the impact on public health from e-cigarettes. The potential harm to bystanders from e-cigarettes is unknown. This is because no long-term data is available. There are limited information on the health effects for children inhaling second-hand vapor. Long-term effects for children inhaling second-hand vapor is not known. Vaping has quickly gained public awareness with greater use among adolescents and adults, resulting in greater inhaled second-hand vapor for adolescents, children, and infants. Second-hand vapor does vary depending on the e-liquid, the device and in the way it is used. There is an array in e-cigarette designs, which has an impact on the amounts of ingredients being exposed to non-users. Heavy advertising and promotion included the assertion that vaping would present little risk to bystanders. E-cigarettes are marketed as "free of primary and second-hand smoke risk" due to no carbon monoxide or tar is expected to be generated during use. However, there is a concern for the health impact of nicotine and other ingredients. Exposure to second-hand vapor may be common. Concerns exist that the increased rates of e-cigarette users who have never smoked could cause harms to public health from the increased nicotine addiction. The growing experimentation with vaping among people under that age of 18 is especially concerning in respect to public health. Ethical concerns arise from possibly vulnerable bystanders being exposed to the not yet known health effects of second-hand vapor. Especially compared to the adverse effects of traditional cigarettes, the overall safety of e-cigarettes is not likely to justify significant public health concerns. Overall, there is a possibility they may greatly harm the public's health. Vaping in areas where smoking is banned indoors could be a move in the wrong direction for public health when considering air quality in addition to being unfavorable for an individual who may have quit nicotine use if they did not vape. Some of the few studies examining the effects on health shown that being exposed to e-cigarette vapor may produce biological effects. Their indiscriminate use may be a threat to public health.

Some non-users have reported adverse effects from the second-hand vapor. Second-hand vapor exhaled into the air by e-cigarette users can expose others to potentially harmful chemicals. Vaping exposes non-users to particulate matter with a diameter of 2.5 μm, which poses health risks to non-users. E-cigarettes produce propylene glycol aerosols at levels known to cause eye and respiratory irritation to non-users. A 2014 study demonstrated that non-smokers living with vaping device users were exposed to nicotine. A 2015 study concluded that, for indirect exposure, two chemicals—nicotine and propylene glycol—exceeded California Environmental Protection Agency exposure level standards for noncarcinogenic health effects. Between January 2012 and December 2014, the FDA noted 35 adverse effect reports regarding second-hand vaping exposure. A 2016 survey found a sizable percentage of middle and high school students were exposed to second-hand e-cigarette vapors. It is recommended that adolescents stay away from being exposed to second-hand e-cigarette vapor. A 2016 study showed that most participated coughed right away and briefly following a single exposure to e-cigarette vapor, while after 15 minutes it induced a diminished cough reflex sensitivity in healthy never-smokers. Nicotine-free e-cigarette vapor did not have this effect. The health effects of passive exposure to e-cigarettes with no nicotine, as well as the extent of exposure to these products, have just begun to be studied. E-cigarettes that do not contain nicotine generate hazardous vapors and could still present a risk to non-users. Research has not evaluated whether non-users can have allergic reactions from nut potential allergens in e-cigarette aerosol.

Since e-cigarettes do not burn tobacco, no side-stream smoke or any cigarette smoke is produced. Only what is exhaled by e-cigarettes users enters the surrounding air. It is not clear how much of inhaled e-cigarette aerosol is exhaled into the environment where non-users can be exposed. Exhaled vapor consists of nicotine and some other particles, primarily consisting of propylene glycol, glycerin, flavors, and aroma transporters. Bystanders are exposed to these particles from exhaled e-cigarette vapor. Clean air is safer than e-cigarette vapor. A mixture of harmful substances, particularly nicotine, ultrafine particles, and VOCs can be exhaled into the air. The liquid particles condenses into a viewable fog. The e-cigarette vapor is in the air for a short time, with a half-life of about 10 seconds; traditional cigarette smoke is in the air 100 times longer. This is because of fast revaporization at room temperature.

A 2017 review found that the "rapid production of new products has made it hard for the concerned stakeholders such as researchers in the public health field and policy makers to ensure that the products introduced to the public are safe for the users and non-users who are involuntarily exposed to e-cigarette vapors." Little research exists on the exhaled particles, nicotine, and cancer-promoting chemicals into indoor air. Concern exists that some of the mainstream vapor exhaled by e-cigarette users may be inhaled by bystanders, particularly indoors. People living with e‐cigarette users had increased salivary concentrations of cotinine. A small number of e-cigarette studies exist on the effect of indoor air quality done on human test subjects in natural settings. Though, the available studies presented conflicting scientific evidence on the exact exposure from the e-cigarette vapor contents which may be a result of the contrasting methodology used during the research process. Vaping can expose non-users to aldehydes and it reduced indoor air quality due to their released aldehydes. Since e-cigarettes involve an aerosolization process, it is suggested that no meaningful amounts of carbon monoxide are emitted. Thus, cardiocirculatory effects caused by carbon monoxide are not likely. However, in an experimental study, e-cigarettes increased levels of carcinogenic polycyclic aromatic hydrocarbons in the surrounding air. Passive inhalation of vapor might have significant adverse effects. Though, e-cigarettes exposes non-users to nicotine but not to tobacco-related combustion toxicants. Exposure to e-cigarette vapor can reduce lung function.

E-cigarettes do pollute the air in the form of exhaled mainstream aerosol from people using e-cigarettes. Nicotine, ultrafine particles, and products of heating propylene glycol and glycerin are increased in the air where e-cigarettes are being used, although, as expected, at lower levels than produced by smoking the same number of traditional cigarettes. As with traditional cigarettes, however, when several people are using e-cigarettes indoors at the same time, the air can become polluted. For example, levels of fine particulate matter (PM2.5) in a large hotel event room (4,023m3) increased from 2–3 μg/m3 to as high as 819 μg/m3 (interquartile range: 761–975 μg/m3) when 59–86 people were using e-cigarettes. This level is comparable to a very (conventional tobacco) smoky bar or casino and dramatically exceeds the US Environmental Protection Agency annual time-weighted standard for PM2.5 of 12 μg/m3.

Evidence has also shown that bystanders absorb nicotine when people around them use e-cigarettes at levels comparable with exposure to traditional cigarette second-hand smoke. In a study of non-smokers living with nicotine e-cigarette users, those living with traditional cigarette smokers, or those living in homes where no one used either product, cotinine (a metabolite of nicotine) levels in bystanders' urine were significantly elevated in both the people exposed to second-hand e-cigarette aerosol and those exposed to second-hand tobacco smoke compared with people living in aerosol- and smoker-free homes. Interestingly, the levels of elevated urinary cotinine in the two exposed groups were not significantly different (although the passive smokers had higher point estimates), despite the fact that the increase in air pollution in the smokers' homes was much higher than in the e-cigarette users' homes (geometric mean air nicotine concentrations of 0.13 μg/m3 in e-cigarette users' homes, 0.74 μg/m3 in smokers' homes, and 0.02 μg/m3 in the control homes).

On the basis of emerging evidence, in 2014 the American Industrial Hygiene Association concluded that "e-cigarettes are not emission-free and that their pollutants could be of health concern for users and those who are exposed secondhand....[T]heir use in the indoor environment should be restricted, consistent with current smoking bans, until and unless research documents that they will not significantly increase the risk of adverse health effects to room occupants." Similarly, in 2016 the American Society of Heating, Refrigeration and Air-Conditioning Engineers (ASHRAE) updated its standard for "Ventilation for Acceptable Indoor Air Quality" to incorporate emissions from e-cigarettes into the definition of "environmental tobacco smoke," which is incompatible with acceptable indoor air quality. , 12 US states and 615 localities had prohibited the use of e-cigarettes in venues in which traditional cigarette smoking was prohibited.

There are benefits to banning vaping indoors in public and working areas, since there is a potential harm of renormalizing tobacco use in smoke-free areas, in addition to, vaping may result in spread of nicotine and other chemicals indoors. E-cigarettes used in indoor environments can put at risk non-smokers to elevated levels of nicotine and aerosol emissions. Non-smokers exposed to e-cigarette aerosol produced by a machine and pumped into a room were found to have detectable levels of the nicotine metabolite cotinine in their blood. The same study stated that 80% of nicotine is normally absorbed by the user, so these results may be higher than in actual second-hand exposure. A 2015 PHE report concluded that e-cigarettes "release negligible levels of nicotine into ambient air with no identified health risks to bystanders". The e-cigarette vapor creates personal exposures that would warrant supervision.

The available evidence demonstrates that the e-cigarette vapor emitted from e-cigarettes is not just "harmless water vapor" as is repeatedly stated in the advertising of e-cigarettes, and they can cause indoor air pollution. A 2014 practice guideline by NPS MedicineWise states, "Although data on health effects of passive vapour are currently lacking, the risks are argued to be small, but claims that e-cigarettes emit only water vapour are nevertheless incorrect. Serum cotinine levels (a metabolite of nicotine) have been found to be similar in bystanders exposed to either e-cigarette vapour or cigarette smoke." A 2015 California Department of Public Health has reported that "Mainstream and secondhand e-cigarette aerosol has been found to contain at least ten chemicals that are on California's Proposition 65 list of chemicals known to cause cancer, birth defects, or other reproductive harm."

A white paper published in 2014 by the American Industrial Hygiene Association concluded e-cigarettes emit airborne contaminants that may be inhaled by the user and those nearby. Due to this possible risk, they urged restriction of their use indoors, similar to smoking bans, until research has shown the aerosol does not significantly harm others in the area. A 2014 review suggested that the levels of inhaled contaminants from the e-cigarette vapor are not of significant health concern for human exposures by the standards used in workplaces to ensure safety. The compounds that are present, are mostly below 1% of the corresponding levels permissible by workplace safety standards. But workplace safety standards do not recognize exposure to certain vulnerable groups such as people with medical ailments, children, and infants who may be exposed to second-hand vapor. Some chemicals from e-cigarette exposures could surpass workplace safety standards. E-cigarette convention studies indicate that second-hand e-cigarette vapor may be significant for workers in conventions where there are people using e-cigarettes, particularly those who encounter the vapor in more than one of these events. Exposure studies suggest that e-cigarette use in indoor areas is higher than the smoke-free level put forth by the US Surgeon General and the WHO Framework Convention on Tobacco Control. The use of e-cigarettes in a smoke-free area could expose non-users to toxicants. The effect on users and bystanders is probably much less harmful than traditional cigarettes.

Second-hand vapor exposes bystanders to numerous pollutants at amounts higher than background air. A 2016 WHO (World Health Organization)report stated that "While some argue that exposure to SHA [second-hand aerosol] is unlikely to cause significant health risks, they concede that SHA can be deleterious to bystanders with some respiratory pre-conditions. It is nevertheless reasonable to assume that the increased concentration of toxicants from SHA over background [air] levels poses an increased risk for the health of all bystanders." A 2014 WHO report stated passive exposure was a concern, indicating that current evidence is insufficient to determine whether the levels of exhaled vapor are safe to involuntarily exposed bystanders. The report stated that "it is unknown if the increased exposure to toxicants and particles in exhaled aerosol will lead to an increased risk of disease and death among bystanders." The British Medical Association (BMA) reported in 2013 that there are "concerns that the use of e-cigarettes could threaten the norm of not smoking in public places and workplaces." Several medical organizations advocate that vaping be banned in public places and workplaces. A 2014 review found it is safe to infer that their effects on bystanders are minimal in comparison to traditional cigarettes. E-cigarette vapor has notably fewer toxicants than cigarette smoke.

Third-hand 
E‐cigarettes can be unsafe to non-users via third-hand exposure, including children, pregnant women, casino employees, housekeeping employees, and vulnerable groups. E-cigarette use by a parent might lead to inadvertent health risks to offspring. E-cigarettes pose many safety concerns to children. For example, indoor surfaces can accumulate nicotine where e-cigarettes were used, which may be inhaled by children, particularly youngsters, long after they were used. A policy statement by the American Association for Cancer Research and the American Society of Clinical Oncology has reported that "Third-hand exposure occurs when nicotine and other chemicals from second-hand aerosol deposit on surfaces, exposing people through touch, ingestion, and inhalation". A 2015 PHE report stated the amount of nicotine deposited was low and that an infant would have to lick 30 square meters to be exposed to 1 mg of nicotine. There are no published studies of third-hand exposure from e-cigarettes, however initial data suggests that nicotine from e-cigarettes may stick to surfaces and would be hard to remove. The extent of third-hand contamination indoors from e-cigarettes in real-world settings has not been established but would be of particular concern for children living in homes of e-cigarette users, as they spend more time indoors, are in proximity to and engage in greater activity in areas where dust collects and may be resuspended (e.g., carpets on the floor), and insert nonfood items in their mouths more frequently.

Adolescents
Frequent vaping among middle and high school students has been correlated with cracked or broken teeth and tongue or cheek pain in a 2017 study relying on self-reporting. There is probable evidence that coughing and wheezing is higher in adolescents who vape.

Reported deaths

Drug Administration Center for Tobacco Products reported between 2008 and the beginning of 2012, 47 cases of adverse effects associated with e-cigarettes, of which eight were considered serious. Two peer-reviewed reports of lipoid pneumonia were related to e-cigarette use, as well as two reports in the media in Spain and the UK. In the UK, the subject reportedly died from severe lipoid pneumonia in 2011. In August 2019, the Illinois Department of Public Health (IDPH) reported the first death in the US linked to vaping. The deceased had been recently using an e-cigarette and was hospitalized with serious respiratory problems.

Direct exposure 

There is a possibility that inhalation, ingestion, or skin contact can expose people to high levels of nicotine. Concerns with exposure to the e-liquids include leaks or spills and contact with contaminants in the e-liquid. This may be especially risky to children, pregnant women, and nursing mothers. The FDA intends to develop product standards around concerns about children's exposure to liquid nicotine. E-liquid exposure whether intentional or unintentional from ingestion, eye contact, or skin contact can cause adverse effects such as seizures, anoxic brain trauma, throwing up, and lactic acidosis. The liquid does quickly absorb into the skin. Local irritation can be induced by skin or mucosal nicotine exposure. The nicotine in e-liquid can be hazardous to infants. Even a portion of e-liquid may be lethal to a little child. An excessive amount of nicotine for a child that is capable of being fatal is 0.1–0.2 mg/kg of body weight. Less than a 1 tablespoon of contact or ingestion of e-liquid can cause nausea, vomiting, cardiac arrest, seizures, or coma. An accidental ingestion of only 6 mg may be lethal to children.

Children are susceptible to ingestion due to their curiosity and desire for oral exploration. Children could confuse the fruity or sweet flavored e-liquid bottles for fruit juices. E-liquids are packed in colorful containers and children may be attracted to the flavored liquids. More youth-oriented flavors include "My Birthday Cake" or "Tutti Frutti Gumballs". Many nicotine cartridges and bottles of liquid are not child-resistant to stop contact or accidental ingestion of nicotine by children. "Open" e-cigarette devices, with a refillable tank for e-liquids, are believed to be the biggest risk to young children. If flavored e-cigarettes are let alone, pets and children could be attracted to them. The FDA states that children are curious and put all sorts of things in their mouths. Even if you turn away for a few seconds, they can quickly get into things that could harm them. The FDA recommends that adults can help prevent accidental exposure to e-liquids by always putting their e-cigarettes and e-liquids up and away—and out of kids' and pets' reach and sight—every time you use them. The FDA recommends to also ask family members, house guests, and other visitors who vape to keep bags or coats that hold e-cigarettes or e-liquids up and away and out of reach and sight of children and pets. They recommend for children old enough to understand, explain to them that these products can be dangerous and should not be touched. The FDA states to tell kids that adults are the only people who should handle these products.

As part of ongoing efforts to protect youth from the dangers of nicotine and tobacco products, the US FDA and the Federal Trade Commission announced on May 1, 2018, they issued 13 warning letters to manufacturers, distributors, and retailers for selling e-liquids used in e-cigarettes with labeling and/or advertising that cause them to resemble kid-friendly food products, such as juice boxes, candy or cookies, some of them with cartoon-like imagery. Several of the companies receiving warning letters were also cited for illegally selling the products to minors. "No child should be using any tobacco product, and no tobacco products should be marketed in a way that endangers kids – especially by using imagery that misleads them into thinking the products are things they would eat or drink. Looking at these side-to-side comparisons is alarming. It is easy to see how a child could confuse these e-liquid products for something they believe they have consumed before – like a juice box. These are preventable accidents that have the potential to result in serious harm or even death. Companies selling these products have a responsibility to ensure they are not putting children in harm's way or enticing youth use, and we'll continue to take action against those who sell tobacco products to youth and market products in this egregious fashion," the FDA Commissioner Dr. Scott Gottlieb, said in 2018. E-liquids have been sold in packaging that looks similar to Tree Top-brand juice boxes, Reddi-wip whipped cream, and Sour Patch Kids gummy candy.

The US FDA announced on August 23, 2018, that all 17 manufacturers, distributors and retailers that were warned by the agency in May, have stopped selling the nicotine-containing e-liquids used in e-cigarettes with labeling or advertising resembling kid-friendly food products, such as juice boxes, candy or cookies that were identified through warning letters as being false or misleading. Following the warning letters in May, the FDA worked to ensure the companies took appropriate corrective action – such as no longer selling the products with the misleading labeling or advertising – and issued close-out letters to the firms. The agency expects some of the companies may sell the products with revised labeling that addresses the concerns expressed in the warning letters. "Removing these products from the market was a critical step toward protecting our kids. We can all agree no kid should ever start using any tobacco or nicotine-containing product, and companies that sell them have a responsibility to ensure they aren't enticing youth use. When companies market these products using imagery that misleads a child into thinking they're things they've consumed before, like a juice box or candy, that can create an imminent risk of harm to a child who may confuse the product for something safe and familiar," said FDA Commissioner Scott Gottlieb.

There is growing evidence that vaping is hazardous to your health including depression which increases the risk of suicidal thoughts and suicide. Nicotine toxicity is of concern when e-cigarette solutions are swallowed intentionally by adults as a suicidal overdose. Seizures or convulsions are known potential side effects of nicotine toxicity and have been reported in the scientific literature in relation to intentional or accidental swallowing of e-liquid. Six people attempted suicide by injecting e-liquid. One adolescent attempted suicide by swallowing the e-liquid. Three deaths were reported to have resulted from swallowing or injecting e-liquid containing nicotine. An excessive amount of nicotine for an adult that is capable of being fatal is 0.5–1 mg/kg of body weight. An oral lethal dose for adults is about 30–60 mg. However the widely used human LD50 estimate of around 0.8 mg/kg was questioned in a 2013 review, in light of several documented cases of humans surviving much higher doses; the 2013 review suggests that the lower limit resulting in fatal events is 500–1000 mg of ingested nicotine, which is equivalent to 6.5–13 mg/kg orally. Reports of serious adverse effects associated with acute nicotine toxicity that resulting in hospitalization were very uncommon. Death from intentional nicotine poisoning is very uncommon. Clear labeling of devices and e-liquid could reduce unintentional exposures. Child-proof packaging and directions for safe handling of e-liquids could minimize some of the risks. Some vaping companies willingly used child-proof packaging in response to the public danger. In January 2016, the Child Nicotine Poisoning Prevention Act of 2015 was passed into law in the US, which requires child-proof packaging. The nicotine exposure rate in the US has since dropped by 18.9% from August 2016 to April 2017, following the Child Nicotine Poisoning Prevention Act of 2015, a federal law mandating child-resistant packaging for e-liquid, came into effect, on July 26, 2016. The states in the US that did not already have a law, experienced a notable decline in the average number of exposures during the 9 months after the Child Nicotine Poisoning Prevention Act of 2015 came into effect compared to before it became law. E-liquids have been observed in 2016 to include a press-and-turn feature similar to what is used for aspirin. E-liquids that were normally available in bottles that were not regarded as child-resistant, have been reported in 2016.

There was inconsistent labeling of the actual nicotine content on e-liquid cartridges from some brands, and some nicotine has been found in "no nicotine" liquids. A 2015 PHE report noted overall the labelling accuracy has improved. Most inaccurately-labelled examples contained less nicotine than stated. Due to nicotine content inconstancy, it is recommended that e-cigarette companies develop quality standards with respect to nicotine content.

Because of the lack of production standards and controls, the pureness of e-liquid are generally not dependable, and testing of some products has shown the existence of harmful substances. The German Cancer Research Center in Germany released a report stating that e-cigarettes cannot be considered safe, in part due to technical flaws that have been found. This includes leaking cartridges, accidental contact with nicotine when changing cartridges, and potential of unintended overdose. The Therapeutic Goods Administration (TGA) of Australia has stated that, "Some overseas studies suggest that electronic cigarettes containing nicotine may be dangerous, delivering unreliable doses of nicotine (above or below the stated quantity), or containing toxic chemicals or carcinogens, or leaking nicotine. Leaked nicotine is a poisoning hazard for the user of electronic cigarettes, as well as others around them, particularly children."

Cannabinoid-enriched e-liquids require lengthy, complex processing, some being readily available online despite lack of quality control, expiry date, conditions of preservation, or any toxicological and clinical assessment. It is assumed that vaporizing cannabinoids at lower temperatures is safer because it produces smaller amounts of toxicants than the hot combustion of a cannabis cigarette. The health effects specific to vaping these cannabis preparations is largely unknown.

Toxicology 

The long-term health impacts of e-cigarette use are unknown. A 2017 review found "The exposure of EC users to potentially toxic chemical emissions is difficult to quantify, given the numerous types of EC devices, different e‑liquids, and disparities in individual use patterns." The long-term health impacts of the main chemicals nicotine and propylene glycol in the aerosol are not fully understood. There is limited peer-reviewed data about the toxicity of e-cigarettes for a complete toxicological evaluation, and their cytotoxicity is unknown. The chemicals and toxicants included in e-cigarettes have not been completely disclosed and their safety is not guaranteed. A 2014 study "indicates that very few commercially marketed e-cigarettes have undergone a thorough toxicology evaluation and standardized testing for evaluating e-cigarette toxicity across brands." They are similar in toxicity to other nicotine replacement products, but e-cigarettes manufacturing standards are variable standards, and many as a result are probably more toxic than nicotine replacement products. The UK National Health Service noted that the toxic chemicals found by the FDA were at levels one-thousandth that of cigarette smoke, and that while there is no certainty that these small traces are harmless, initial test results are reassuring. While there is variability in the ingredients and concentrations of ingredients in e-cigarette liquids, tobacco smoke contains thousands of chemicals, most of which are not understood and many of which are known to be harmful.

Carcinogenicity 
Concerns about the carcinogenicity of e-cigarettes arise from both nicotine and from other chemicals that may be in the vapor. As regards nicotine, there is evidence from in vitro and animal research that nicotine may have a role as a tumor promoter, but carcinogenicity has not been demonstrated in vivo. A 2014 Surgeon General of the United States report stated that the single relevant randomized trial "does not indicate a strong role for nicotine in promoting carcinogenesis in humans". They concluded that "There is insufficient data to conclude that nicotine causes or contributes to cancer in humans, but there is evidence showing possible oral, esophageal, or pancreatic cancer risks". Nicotine in the form of nicotine replacement products is less of a cancer risk than with smoking, and they have not been shown to be associated with cancer in the real world. Nicotine promotes metastasis by causing cell cycle progression, epithelial-to-mesenchymal transition, migration, invasion, angiogenesis, and avoidance of apoptosis in a number of systems. Nicotine does promote the growth of blood vessels that supply tumors and it speeds tumor growth. Whether long-term vaping can raise the chance for malignancy in individuals with a susceptibility for tumor growth is unknown. The effects of nicotine on the sympathoadrenal system could stimulate the advancement of cancer in people who have cancer.

Nicotine has been shown to induce DNA damage in the Escherichia colipol A+/pol− test. Low concentrations of nicotine stimulate cell proliferation, while high concentrations are cytotoxic. Nicotine decreases the tumor suppressor Chk2, which is activated by DNA damage. The decrease in Chk2 in cells exposed to nicotine suggests that nicotine may be capable of overriding DNA damage checkpoint activation, disrupting genetic surveillance, and increasing the risk of oncogenesis. There is strong evidence that some substances found in e-cigarette vapors such as formaldehyde and acrolein can induce DNA damage and mutagenesis.

Nicotine promotes endothelial cell migration, proliferation, survival, tube formation, and nitric oxide (NO) production in vitro, mimicking the effect of other angiogenic growth factors. In 2001, it was found that nicotine was a potent angiogenic agent at tissue and plasma concentrations similar to those induced by light to moderate smoking. Effects of nicotine on angiogenesis have been demonstrated for a number of tumor cells, such as breast, colon, and lung. Similar results have also been demonstrated in in vivo mouse models of lung cancer, where nicotine significantly increased the size and number of tumors in the lung, and enhanced metastasis.

A 2014 study suggested that e-cigarette use may be a risk factor for lung cancer. In several in vitro experiments, it has been found that nicotine in concentrations as low as 1 μM decreased the anti-proliferative and pro-apoptotic effects exerted by chemotherapeutics on several different malignant cell lines. These effects were partially reverted by exposure to α-bungarotoxin (α-BTX), an inhibitor of α7-nAChR. In the case of radiotherapy (RT), nicotine administration increased survival of H460 and A549 lung cancer cells. This effect was likewise reduced by addition of α-BTX prior to nicotine addition and radiation. On this basis, it is expected that use of nicotine products during cancer treatment may reduce the effects due to reactions following interaction of nicotine with α7-nAChR.

Evidence from experimental in vitro studies on cell cultures, in vivo studies on rodents as well as studies on humans inclusive of epidemiological studies indicate that nicotine may contribute in cancer development by stimulating a number of important processes. Nicotine acts primarily by activation of nicotine acetylcholine receptors and nicotine binds to these receptors with a higher affinity than acetylcholine. Furthermore, the tobacco-specific nitrosamines (TSNAs) NNN (N′-nitrosonornicotine) and NNK (4-(metylnitrosamino)-1-(3-pyridyl)-1-butanon) may be formed from nicotine after oral administration. E-cigarettes deliver the potent lung carcinogen NNK. Some evidence indicates that the NNK dose-response curve for cancer is highly nonlinear, with substantial increases in risk at low doses. Known bladder carcinogens have been detected in the urine of e-cigarette users but not in non-users. A 2015 study reported that the urine from users of e-cigarettes had very low levels of NNAL (4-(methylnitrosamino)-1-(3-pyridyl)-1-butanol), which may suggest that endogenous formation of TSNA after nicotine inhalation is negligible. The data does indicate that TSNA may be formed internally after absorption of nicotine through the mucous membranes in the oral cavity and through the skin, while formation after lung absorption may be negligible. Thus, the toxicokinetics of nicotine may depend on the route of administration. The role of nicotine in carcinogenesis is of great importance in the evaluation of potentially harmful effects from non-tobacco related sources of nicotine, such as e-cigarettes.

Nicotine has been shown to induce chromosomal aberration, chromatid exchange, single-strand DNA strand breaks, and micronuclei in vitro. Oxidative stress is probably involved since the effects are reduced in the presence of antioxidants. The finding that the effects decrease after co-incubation with a nicotinic acetylcholine receptor antagonist indicates a receptor-dependent pathway for induction of oxidative stress.

The interaction of nicotine with nicotinic acetylcholine receptors activates signaling pathways that result in a number of reactions, such as increased cell proliferation and cell survival. Although nicotinic acetylcholine receptors are the primary receptors, binding of nicotine to β-ARs and EGFRs may also be important. Nicotine induces epithelial–mesenchymal transition, which is one of the vital steps for the acquisition of malignant phenotype. This transition allows the cell to acquire migratory properties, which may facilitate cancer metastases. Moreover, nicotine induces changes that mimic the effects of angiogenic growth factors.

At present, it is not possible to draw a conclusion whether nicotine itself may act as a complete carcinogen. In mice studies with NNK as an initiator, nicotine acts as a promoter after injection or dermal absorption, but not after oral administration. In drinking water experiments, there is considerable first-pass metabolism of nicotine before nicotine enters the systemic circulation. As a result, serum concentration is much lower after ingestion than after intraperitoneal injection administration. Nicotine enhanced tumor growth and progression after injection of malignant cells in mice. Enhancements were found both after exposure of nicotine by intraperitoneal injection, oral, and skin administration. Moreover, cotinine did also enhance tumor growth. Nicotine may inhibit antitumor immune response. It has also been reported that exposure to nicotine adversely affects dendritic cells, a cell type that has an important role in anticancer immunosurveillance. Moreover, in studies on xenograft in mice, nicotine has been found to reduce the effect of radiotherapy and chemoradiotherapy.

There is no long-term research concerning the cancer risk related to the potentially small level of exposure to the identified carcinogens in the e-cigarette vapor. Their long-term effect on risk of developing cancer is not known. Their long-term use is anticipated to raise the risk of developing lung cancer. A 2015 study found carcinogenicity was mainly evident in the lungs, mouth, and throat, which may be associated with nitrosamines, propylene glycol and some flavoring additives. Vaping is associated with a possible risk of developing head and neck cancers. In May 2014, Cancer Research UK stated that there are "very preliminary unpublished results that suggest that e-cigarettes promote tumour growth in human cells." The e-cigarette vapors triggered DNA strand breaks and lowered cell survival in vitro, regardless of nicotine content. A 2013 study found some samples of e-cigarette vapors had cytotoxic effects on cardiac muscle cells, though the effects were less than with cigarette smoke. Studies demonstrate that e-cigarette vapor have adverse effects on primary airway epithelial cells and tumor cell lines, and other epithelial cell lines, that ranged from reducing viability, an increase in production of inflammatory mediators and oxidative stress, to reducing antimicrobial defences and pro-carcinogenic events. In October 2012, the World Medical Association stated, "Manufacturers and marketers of e-cigarettes often claim that use of their products is a safe alternative to smoking, particularly since they do not produce carcinogenic smoke. However, no studies have been conducted to determine that the vapor is not carcinogenic, and there are other potential risks associated with these devices."

Since nicotine-containing e-liquids are made from tobacco they may contain impurities like cotinine, anabasine, anatabine, myosmine and beta-nicotyrine. The health implications of nicotine-related impurities are not known. A 2016 review found "Some studies have demonstrated that impurities and nicotine degradation products such as nicotine-cis-N-oxide, nicotine-trans-N-oxide, myosmine, anabasine, and anatabine, which are very carcinogenic, can be found in e-cigarette refill liquids. The molecules can lead to mutations in genes such as Ras (vital function in signal transduction of cell proliferation), p53 and Retinoblastoma (with roles as tumour suppressors) as these molecules can form adducts with cellular DNA." The majority of e-cigarettes evaluated included carcinogenic TSNAs; heavy metals such as cadmium, nickel, and lead; and the carcinogen toluene. However, in comparison to traditional cigarette smoke, the toxic substance levels identified in e-cigarette vapor were 9- to 450-fold less. E-liquid with tin was cytotoxic. E-cigarettes cannot be considered absolutely safe because there is no safe level for carcinogens.

A 2014 review found higher levels of carcinogens and toxicants than in an FDA regulated nicotine inhaler, suggesting that regulated FDA devices may deliver nicotine more safely. In 2014, the World Lung Foundation (now known as Vital Strategies) stated that "Researchers find that many e-cigarettes contain toxins, contaminants and carcinogens that conflict with the industry's portrayal of its products as purer, healthier alternatives. They also find considerable variations in the amount of nicotine delivered by different brands. None of this information is made available to consumers so they really don't know what they are ingesting, or how much."

A 2014 review found "Various chemical substances and ultrafine particles known to be toxic, carcinogenic and/or to cause respiratory and heart distress have been identified in e-cigarette aerosols, cartridges, refill liquids and environmental emissions." Few of the methods used to analyze the chemistry of e-cigarettes in the studies the review evaluated were validated. Many variables affect the levels of toxicants in the e-cigarette vapor, including the design, the type of liquid, and user behavior. The FDA in 2009 analyzed e-liquid cartridge samples from two brands of e-cigarettes, which were NJOY and Smoking Everywhere. Their analysis of the e-cigarette samples showed that the products contained detectable levels of known carcinogens and toxic chemicals to which users could potentially be exposed. Diethylene glycol was detected in one cartridge at approximately 1%. Diethylene glycol, an ingredient used in antifreeze, is toxic to humans. The source of the diethylene glycol contamination is not clear but could reflect the use of non-pharmaceutical grade propylene glycol. On July 22, 2009, the FDA warned that e-cigarettes may present a health risk.

Other chemicals in vapor on the California Prop 65 list of chemicals known to cause cancer or reproductive harm include benzenene and isoprene.

Propylene glycol and other content 

The primary base ingredients of the liquid solution is propylene glycol and glycerin. About 20% to 27% of propylene glycol and glycerin-based liquid particles are inhaled. A 2016 study found that 6% of nicotine, 8% of propylene glycol, and 16% of glycerin was breathed out by e-cigarette users. The long-term effects of inhaled propylene glycol has not been studied, and is unknown. The effects of inhaled glycerin are unknown. Being exposed to propylene glycol may cause irritation to the eyes and respiratory tract. When propylene glycol is heated and aerosolized, it could turn into propylene oxide, which the International Agency for Research on Cancer (IARC) states is possibly carcinogenic to humans. The risk from the inhalation of propylene glycol and glycerin is probably low. Propylene glycol and glycerin have not been shown to be safe. Some research states that propylene glycol emissions may cause respiratory irritation and raise the likelihood to develop asthma. Long-term inhalation of propylene glycol indoors could increase risk to children to develop asthma. To lessen the risks, most e-cigarettes companies began to use water and glycerin as replacement for propylene glycol. The inhaled glycerin could cause lipoid pneumonia. Propylene glycol and glycerin had increased the amount of hydrogen peroxide.

Some e-cigarette products had acrolein identified in the aerosol. It may be generated when glycerin is heated to higher temperatures. Acrolein may induce irritation to the upper respiratory tract, and harm the lining of the lungs. Acrolein induces oxidative stress and inflammation, leading to a disruption in the function of the endothelial cell barrier in the lung. Acrolein may lead to chronic obstructive pulmonary disease. Acrolein levels were reduced by 60% in dual users and 80% for those that completely switched to e-cigarettes when compared to traditional cigarettes. A 2017 review stated that "based on the average of 120 puffs/day reported in the literature, our calculated levels of acrolein emitted by e‐cigarette users per day were found to vary between 0.00792 and 8.94 ppm/day." E-cigarettes vapor have been found to create oxidants and reactive oxygen species (OX/ROS). OX/ROS could react with other substances in the e-cigarette vapor because they are highly reactive. Although e-cigarettes have been found to contain OX/ROS at about 100 times less than in cigarette smoke, they probably induce meaningful biological effects. A 2014 study showed that e-liquids from a specific manufacturer contained greater amounts of ethylene glycol than glycerin or propylene glycol, but ethylene glycol has not been permitted for use in products meant for human consumption.

The toxicity of e-cigarettes and e-liquid can vary greatly, as there are differences in construction and materials in the delivery device, kind and origin of ingredients in the e-liquid, and the use or non-use of good manufacturing practices and quality control approaches. If exposure of aerosols to propylene glycol and glycerin rises to levels that one would consider the exposure in association with a workplace setting, it would be sensible to investigate the health of exposed persons. The short-term toxicity of e-cigarette use appears to be low, with the exception for some people with reactive airways.

Flavoring 

The essential propylene glycol and/or glycerin mixture may consist of natural or artificial substances to provide it flavor. Health effects of e-cigarette flavorings are not entirely known. There is very limited toxicological data on inhaling flavoring additives. Flavorings can be a significant part of toxicants in the e-cigarette vapor. Each flavor has a different chemical composition, and therefore, probably, a distinct composition of toxicant emissions. The cytotoxicity of e-liquids varies, and contamination with various chemicals have been detected in the liquid. Some liquids were very toxic and others had little or no cytotoxicity. The cytotoxicity is mostly due to the amount and number of flavors added. Since nicotine has a bitter taste, nicotine e-liquids contain chemicals to cover up the nicotine taste. The liquids contain aromatic substances like tobacco, fruit, vanilla, caramel, and coffee. Generally, these additives are imprecisely described, using terms such as "vegetable flavoring". Although they are approved for human consumption there are no studies on the short-term or long-term effects of inhaling them. The safety of inhaling flavors is mostly unknown, and their safety has not been determined by the Flavor and Extract Manufacturers Association. The majority of flavorings in e-liquids have not been investigated for toxicity by means of inhalation. A 2017 review found "The Flavor and Extract Manufacturers Association (Federal Emergency Management Agency) of the USA, a trade association of flavor ingredient manufacturers which evaluates the safety of food flavorings, has identified 1037 flavoring agents as potential respiratory hazards due to possible volatility and respiratory irritant properties. Common e-cig flavoring agents on this list include, but are not limited to: diacetyl, acetoin, 2,3-pentanedione (buttery flavors), camphor and cyclohexanone (minty flavors), benzaldehyde (cherry or almond flavors), cinnamaldehyde (cinnamon flavor), cresol (leathery or medicinal flavor), butyraldehyde (chocolate flavor), and isoamyl acetate (banana flavor)." A 2017 review stated, "the implication by manufacturers that flavor ingredients used in e-cigarettes and related devices (e.g. hookahs) are safe for inhalation because they have FEMA GRAS™ status for use in food has been stated to be 'false and misleading' by FEMA."

The extensive and unregulated use of flavoring additives may pose health concerns. Many flavors are irritants. The limited data available on their flavoring agents suggest that the majority of flavorings could lead to significant health risks from long-term use, particularly the ones that are sweet. In some cases e-liquids contain very large amounts of flavorings, which may cause irritation and inflammation on respiratory and cardiovascular systems. A 2016 study of 30 e-cigarette products in the US market found that 13 were more than 1% flavor chemicals by weight, some of which were of potential toxicological concern (e.g., cause respiratory irritation). Some flavors are regarded as toxic and a number of them resemble known carcinogens. The cytotoxicity of some flavors such as strawberry seems to be greater than others. A 2016 study of five flavors across six types of e-cigarettes found that flavors significantly affected the in vitro toxicity profile and the strawberry-flavored product was the most toxic. Some artificial flavors are known to be cytotoxic. Unflavored vapor is less cytotoxic than flavored vapor. A 2012 study demonstrated that in embryonic and adult cellular models, some substances of the e-cigarette vapor such as flavoring not found in tobacco smoke were cytotoxic. The caffeine exposures from vaping are approximately at amounts considerably less than in comparison with consuming caffeinated beverages. There is very limited information available regarding the effects of breathing in caffeine. The evidence is unclear that particular flavorings carry health risks, though there are indications that breathing in some may be a source of avoidable risks.

Cinnamaldehyde has been described as a highly cytotoxic material in vitro in cinnamon-flavored refill liquids. Cinnamaldehyde has also been detected in tobacco flavors, sweet flavors (e.g. caramel), and fruit flavors. Cinnamaldehyde have been identified as cytotoxic at the amount of about 400 times less than those allowed for use by the US Environmental Protection Agency. Compared to other flavors, coffee and cinnamon flavor are the most toxic. The four most commonly found flavor additives were vanillin, ethyl maltol, ethyl vanillin and menthol. They are carcinogenic or toxic, which contribute to causing cardiopulmonary diseases and neurodegenerative disorders. An 18-year-old patient reported using a Juul device with mint flavored pods in the days leading to episodes of pneumothorax in January 2019. In sampling multiple e-cigarette delivery systems, a 2019 study found Juul pods were the only product to demonstrate in vitro cytotoxicity from both nicotine and flavor chemical content, in particular ethyl maltol. There is limited information on the effects of inhaling menthol. Many flavoring additives likely cause respiratory effects not typically seen in cigarette smokers. The evidence is sparse to directly associate inhalations of cinnamon with developing or aggravating asthma. Some flavorings could cause lung inflammation. Fruity, sweet, and traditional tobacco flavorings may result in lung toxicity. Flavorings can harm lung cells by producing free radicals and inflammation. Some e-liquids containing cinnamaldehyde stimulate TRPA1, which might induce effects on the lung. In human lung fibroblasts, cinnamon roll flavoring resulted in a noticeable rise in the amount of inflammatory cytokine IL-8. E-liquids contain possibly toxic aldehydes and reactive oxygen species (ROS). Many flavors are known aldehydes, such as anisaldehyde, cinnamaldehyde, and isovaleraldehyde. Saccharides in sweet e-liquid flavors break down and generate furans and aldehydes when vaporized. The consequences of aldehyde-containing flavors on pulmonary surfaces are unknown. A 2012 study found butterscotch flavor was highly toxic with one liquid and two others had a low toxicity. A 2014 in vitro study showed that menthol flavors have a damaging effect on human periodontal ligament fibroblast growth. Methanol had increased the amount of hydrogen peroxide. A 2017 study found a variety of flavoring initiated inflammatory cytokines in lung cell cultures, of which acetoin and maltol were among the most strongest. A 2014 in vitro study demonstrated that e-cigarette use of a "balsamic" flavor with no nicotine can activate the release of proinflammatory cytokine in lung epithelial cells and keratinocytes. Some additives may be added to reduce the irritation on the pharynx. The long-term toxicity is subject to the additives and contaminants in the e-liquid. It is possible that flavors may worsen some of harmful effects in various cell types such as diminished cell viability, escalated rates of apoptosis, escalated DNA strand breaks, alterations in cell morphology and intensified inflammatory mediator production.

Certain flavorings contain diacetyl and acetyl propionyl which give a buttery taste. Some sweet flavors containing diacetyl and acetyl propionyl include butter, chocolate, milk, or toffee. Diacetyl occurs in a variety of e-cigarette flavorings such as caramel, butterscotch, watermelon, pina colada, and strawberry. A 2016 Harvard detected 39 of the 51 flavored e-cigarettes tested contained diacetyl. The American Lung Association recommended in 2016 that the FDA require that diacetyl and other unsafe chemicals be omitted from e-cigarettes. Menthol flavorings could also contain diacetyl. Diacetyl and acetyl propionyl are associated with bronchiolitis obliterans. A 2018 PHE report stated that the e-cigarette flavorings containing diacetyl is not likely to present a considerable risk. A 2015 review recommended for specific regulation of diacetyl and acetyl propionyl in e-liquid, which are safe when ingested but have been associated with respiratory harm when inhaled. Being exposed to diacetyl produces morphological alterations in the liver according to animal studies. Both diacetyl and acetyl-propionyl have been found in concentrations above those recommended by the US National Institute for Occupational Safety and Health. Diacetyl is normally found at lower levels in e-cigarettes than in traditional cigarettes. 2, 3-pentanedione, is a α-diketone that is chemically and structurally similar to diacetyl. Although it has become a popular replacement for diacetyl, acute inhalation exposure to 2, 3-pentanedione has been shown to cause airway epithelial damage similar to diacetyl. Some liquids use butyric acid instead of diacetyl and acetyl propionyl, but it could have negative health effects. Concerns exist that the flavors and additives in e-cigarettes might lead to diseases, including the popcorn lung. The cardiovascular effects, including a vast range of flavorings and fragrances, is unknown. Compared to other flavors, cherry contains a greater amount of benzaldehyde, a main ingredient for a variety of fruit flavors. Because benzaldehyde can irritate the eyes and mucous membranes of the respiratory tracts with workplace exposure, concerns have been expressed regarding the toxicity of flavored e-cigarette vapor. The irritants butyl acetate, diethyl carbonate, benzoic acid, quinoline, bis(2-ethylhexyl) phthalate, and 2,6-dimethyl phenol were present as undeclared ingredients in the e-liquid. The precise ingredients of e-cigarettes are not known. A 2010 study found rimonabant when examining e-liquids. This weight loss drug has been linked to seizures and suicide. The same study also determined e-liquid can contain amino-tadalafil which is a component of Cialis, used for erectile dysfunction. Users are at risk of encountering negative health outcomes from the small possibility of being exposed to pharmacologic compounds in some e-liquids.

The Centers for Disease Control tested in 2015 36 e-cigarette products for 10 flavor compounds commonly used as additives in tobacco products. Measurable levels of eucalyptol and pulegone were found in the menthol-flavored varieties for all manufacturers. Menthol concentrations ranged from 3,700 to 12,000 μg/g in flavored e-liquids, levels similar to those found in the filler of traditional cigarettes. Interestingly, menthol was found at low concentrations in 40% of the tobacco-flavored nonmenthol products tested. Other flavor compounds found were camphor, methyl, salicylate, pulegone, cinnamaldehyde (CAD), and eugenol. Tierney and colleagues in 2016 analyzed 30 e-cigarette products on the U.S. market and found 13 products contained more than 1% flavor chemicals by weight. Among the chemicals identified were aldehydes (e.g., benzaldehyde and vanillin), which are categorized as primary irritants of the respiratory tract. Tierney and colleagues also found that tobacco-flavored e-liquids were derived from confection-flavored chemicals (e.g., bubble gum and cotton candy flavoring) rather than tobacco extract. Various candy and fruit flavor e-liquids that are enticing to youth exhibit in cell culture cytotoxic or mutagenic effects.

Formaldehyde 
The IARC has categorized formaldehyde as a human carcinogen, and acetaldehyde is categorized as a potential carcinogenic to humans. Formaldehyde induced DNA damage and inhibited DNA repair. Acetaldehyde generated crosslinking of DNA-protein which impede with DNA metabolic functions, including replication, repair, recombination, transcription and chromatin remodeling. Aldehydes may cause harmful health effects; though, in the majority of cases, the amounts inhaled are less than with traditional cigarettes. A 2016 study found that e-liquids without flavoring generated no aldehydes, which indicated that the flavors were causing the creation of aldehydes, according to a 2018 PHE report. Many chemical compounds can inadvertently be produced from e-cigarettes, especially carbonyl compounds like formaldehyde, acetaldehyde, acrolein, and glyoxal by the chemical reaction of the e-liquid when the nichrome wire (heating element) is heated, to high temperatures. These compounds are frequently identified in e-cigarette aerosols. Potentially hazardous carbonyls have been identified in e-cigarette aerosols produced at temperatures above 200 °C. The propylene glycol-containing liquids produced the most amounts of carbonyls in e-cigarette aerosols. The levels of toxic chemicals in the e-cigarette vapor were found to be 1 to 2 orders of magnitude smaller than with cigarette smoke but greater than from a nicotine inhaler. Nearly all e-cigarettes evaluated, toxic and irritation-causing carbonyls were identified. Reports regarding the levels of toxic chemicals were inconsistent. This includes a study showing that the levels of toxicants in e-cigarettes may be higher than with cigarette smoke.

Battery output voltage influences the level of the carbonyl substances in the e-cigarette vapor. Some newer e-cigarette models let users boost the amount of vapor and nicotine provided by modifying the battery output voltage. E-cigarettes that were modified to boost the vapor production are more dangerous to use. High-voltage e-cigarettes could subject users to large amounts of carbonyls. E-cigarettes with higher voltages (5.0 V) can emit carcinogens including formaldehyde at levels comparable to cigarette smoke, while reduced voltages (3.0 V) generate aerosol with levels of formaldehyde and acetaldehyde roughly 13 and 807-fold less than in cigarette smoke. The average amount of formaldehyde in vapor from high-voltage devices is higher than the average amount of formaldehyde released from cigarettes. "Dripping", where the liquid is dripped directly onto the atomizer, can create carbonyls including formaldehyde.

Controversy exists regarding the specific amount of formaldehyde expected to be breathed in by the user. A 2015 PHE report found that normal e-cigarette use generates very low levels of aldehydes. Normal usage of e-cigarettes generates very low levels of formaldehyde, and at normal settings they generate very low levels of formaldehyde. A 2018 PHE report found that at normal usage temperatures, aldehyde in the e-cigarette vapor is at negligible amounts in comparison with smoking. Later-generation and "hotter" e-cigarettes may generate equal or higher levels of formaldehyde compared to smoking. A 2015 study analyzing 10 puffs found that vaping at a high voltage (5.0 V) generates formaldehyde in e-cigarette vapor; they inferred from the finding that the user vaping at high voltage with 3 ml of e-liquid daily would inhale 14.4±3.3 mg of formaldehyde daily in formaldehyde-emitting chemicals. This was estimated to be a lifetime cancer risk of 5 to 15 times greater than compared with long-term smoking. A 2015 study using a third-generation device, very low levels of formaldehyde were produced on lower power, although, when adjusted to a maximum power setting, levels were greater than with cigarette smoke. Running at a higher power (temperature) not only increases nicotine delivery, but also increases the amount of formaldehyde and other aldehydes that are naturally produced by heating up propylene glycol or glycerin and other toxicants produced in the e-cigarette aerosol. A 2015 PHE report found that by applying maximum power and increasing the time the device is used on a puffing machine, e-liquids can thermally degrade and produce high levels of formaldehyde. Users detect the "dry puff" (also known as a "dry hit") and avoid it, and they concluded that "There is no indication that EC users are exposed to dangerous levels of aldehydes." However, e-cigarette users may learn to overcome the unpleasant taste due to elevated aldehyde formation, when the nicotine craving is high enough.

Nicotine 

Pregnant women, breastfeeding mothers, and the elderly are more sensitive to nicotine than other individuals. There are safety issues with the nicotine exposure from e-cigarettes, which may cause addiction and other adverse effects. Nicotine is regarded as a potentially lethal poison. Concerns exist that vaping can be harmful by exposing users to toxic levels of nicotine. At low amounts, it has a mild analgesic effect. At sufficiently high doses, nicotine may result in nausea, vomiting, diarrhea, salivation, bradyarrhythmia, and possibly seizures and hypoventilation. High doses can induce deleterious effects on the growth of osteoblasts. Higher-doses leads to loss of nicotinic receptor specificity and induces cholinergic toxicity. The highest-doses can lead to coma. However, at the low amount of nicotine provided by e-cigarettes fatal overdose from use is unlikely; in contrast, the potent amount of nicotine in e-cigarettes liquids may be toxic if it is accidentally ingested or absorbed via the skin. The health effects of nicotine in infants and children are unclear.

E-cigarettes provide nicotine to the blood quicker than nicotine inhalers. The levels were above that of nicotine replacement product users. E-cigarettes seem to have a pharmacokinetic nicotine profile closer to nicotine replacement products than with traditional cigarettes. How efficiently different e-cigarettes give nicotine is unclear. Serum cotinine levels are comparable to that of traditional cigarettes, but are inharmonious and rely upon the user and the device. Blood nicotine levels raised more gradually and took more time to get to peak concentration with e-cigarettes than with traditional cigarettes. Vaping was found to have comparable levels of nicotine urinary metabolites to those who were tobacco and smokeless tobacco product users. Though, the oxidative nicotine metabolites were less in those who were vaping. Evidence indicates that some vaping products may deliver the same amount of nicotine as traditional cigarettes. There is fair evidence that chance and degree of dependence are less for e-cigarettes than traditional cigarettes, according to a 2018 National Academies of Sciences, Engineering, and Medicine report. It not clear the level of addictiveness of e-cigarettes, compared with traditional cigarettes, according to a 2018 PHE report. The report also stated "nicotine addictiveness depends on a number of factors including presence of other chemicals, speed of delivery, pH, rate of absorption, the dose, and other aspects of the nicotine delivery system, environment and behaviour." Users vaping without using nicotine exhibited symptoms of dependence, according to a 2015 study. E-cigarette packages and advertisements require health warnings under US law, stating "WARNING: This product contains nicotine. Nicotine is an addictive chemical."

Aerosol composition 

The chemical composition of the e-cigarette aerosol varies across and within manufacturers. Limited data exists regarding their chemistry. The aerosol of e-cigarettes is generated when the e-liquid reaches a temperature of roughly 100–250 °C within a chamber, which is thought to cause pyrolysis of the e-liquid and could also lead to decomposition of other liquid ingredients. The vapor usually contains propylene glycol, glycerin, nicotine, flavors, aroma transporters, and other substances. The levels of nicotine, TSNAs, aldehydes, metals, volatile organic compounds (VOCs), flavors, and tobacco alkaloids in e-cigarette vapors vary greatly. The yield of chemicals found in the e-cigarette vapor varies depending on, several factors, including the e-liquid contents, puffing rate, and the battery voltage.

E-cigarettes consist of fine and ultrafine particles of particulate matter, in the form of an aerosol. The aerosol (mist) produced by an e-cigarette is commonly but inaccurately called vapor. In physics, a vapor is a substance in the gas phase whereas an aerosol is a suspension of tiny particles of liquid, solid or both within a gas. The word "vaping" is not technically accurate when applied to e-cigarettes. The aerosol is made-up of liquid sub-micron particles of condensed vapor; thus, the users of these devices are rather "aerosolizing." This aerosol that is produces looks like cigarette smoke to some extent. After a puff, inhalation of the aerosol travels from the device into the mouth and lungs. The composition of e-liquids varies widely due to the extensive range of nicotine levels and flavoring additives used in these products, which result in a hugely great number of different chemical vapor combinations potentially breathed in by the user.

The particles produced from vaping are comparable in particle-size distribution and number of particles to cigarette smoke, with the majority of them in the ultrafine range. Some e-cigarettes released more particles than cigarette smoke. A 2014 review found that fine particles can be chemically intricate and not uniform, and what a particle is made of, the exact harmful elements, and the importance of the size of the particle is mostly unknown. They found that because these things are uncertain, it is not clear whether the ultrafine particles in e-cigarette vapor have health effects similar to those produced by traditional cigarettes. A 2014 WHO report found e-cigarettes release a lower concentration of particles than traditional cigarettes.

Metals 
There is limited evidence on the long-term exposure of metals. Exposure to the levels and kinds of metals found in the aerosol relies upon the material and other manufacturing designs of the heating element. E-cigarettes contain some contamination with small amounts of metals in the emissions but it is not likely that these amounts would cause a serious risk to the health of the user. According to a 2018 PHE report, metals emissions no matter how small, are not needed. They further stated, "EC [e-cigarettes] that generate minimal metal emissions should become an industry standard." The device itself could contribute to the toxicity from the small amounts of silicate and heavy metals found in the liquid and vapor, because they have metal parts that come in contact with the e-liquid. Low levels of possibly harmful chromium, lead, and nickel metals have been found in the emissions. Chromium and nickel nanoparticles have also been found. Copper nanoparticles can induce mitochondrial and DNA injury in lung fibroblasts. DNA repair can be impeded by titanium dioxide nanoparticles from the e-cigarette vapor. This was demonstrated that the titanium dioxide nanoparticles induced single-strand breaks and produced oxidative stress in the DNA of A549 cells. The risk of inhaling nanoparticles is an area of concern. The toxicity of nanoparticles is unknown. Metals including nickel, cadmium, lead and silicate can found in the e-cigarette vapors, and are thought to be carcinogenic, nephrotoxic, neurotoxic, and hemotoxic. Heavy metals are correlated with serious health issues. Inhaling lead can induce serious neurologic injury, notably to the growing brains of children.

Metals may adversely affect the nervous system. Metals found in the e-cigarette vapor may induce cell damage and initiate inflammatory cytokine such as in human lung fibroblasts. A 2017 review found "E-cigarette aerosols and copper nanoparticles induced mitochondrial ROS production, mitochondrial stress (reduced stability of OxPhos electron transport chain (ETC) complex IV subunit) and DNA fragmentation in lung fibroblasts." A 2013 review found metallic and nanoparticles are associated with respiratory distress and disease. A 2014 review found considerable amounts of tin, metals, and silicate particles that came from various components of the e-cigarette were released into the aerosol, which result in exposure that could be higher than with cigarette smoke. A 2013 study found metal particles in the aerosol were at levels 10-50 times less than permitted in inhalation medicines. A 2014 review suggested that there is no evidence of contamination of the aerosol with metals that justifies a health concern. Cadmium that have been found in the e-cigarette vapor is linked to low sperm density.

First-generation devices 

E-cigarettes resembling cigarettes typically produce much less blood nicotine levels. When compared to traditional cigarettes older devices usually delivered low amounts of nicotine. E-cigarette use can be associated with a substantial dispersion of nicotine, thus generating a plasma nicotine concentration which can be comparable to that of traditional cigarettes. This is due to the minute nicotine particles in the e-cigarette vapor, which permit quick delivery into the bloodstream. The nicotine delivered from e-cigarettes enters the body slower than traditional cigarettes. Studies suggest that inexperienced users obtain moderate amounts of nicotine from e-cigarettes. Concerns were raised over inconsistent amounts of nicotine delivered when drawing on the device.

Newly developed devices 

Tank or adjustable e-cigarettes can raise nicotine levels as high as traditional cigarettes. Later-generation e-cigarettes give nicotine more effectively than first-generation e-cigarettes. Later-generation models with concentrated nicotine liquids may deliver nicotine at levels similar to traditional cigarettes. Some e-cigarette tank devices with stronger batteries heat solutions to greater temperatures, which may raise levels of nicotine in the blood similar to those of traditional cigarettes. Research suggests that experienced e-cigarettes users are able to get as much nicotine from e-cigarettes as traditional cigarettes. Later-generation e-cigarettes containing sufficient nicotine elevate heart rate comparable to traditional cigarettes. Later-generation devices delivery 35% to 72% more nicotine than compared with first‐generation devices. Second-generation e-cigarettes raised the heart rate and blood pressure similar to traditional cigarettes. As there are design changes, later-generation devices may provide nicotine similar to traditional cigarettes with a highly concentrated amount potential straight to the brain. Such devices may largely reshape the effects on cardiac safety, misuse, and addiction. There is not much research on fourth-generation devices.

Concerns 

The health effects of long-term nicotine use is unknown. It may be decades before the long-term health effects of nicotine vapor inhalation is known. It is not recommended for non-smokers. Public health authorities do not recommend nicotine use for non-smokers. The pureness of the nicotine differs by grade and producer. The impurities associated with nicotine are not as toxic as nicotine. The health effects of vaping tobacco alkaloids that stem from nicotine impurities in e-liquids is not known. Nicotine affects practically every cell in the body. The complex effects of nicotine are not entirely understood. It poses several health risks. Short-term nicotine use excites the autonomic ganglia nerves and autonomic nerves, but chronic use seems to induce negative effects on endothelial cells. Nicotine may have a profound impact on sleep. The effects on sleep vary after being intoxicated, during withdrawal, and from long-term use. Nicotine may result in arousal and wakefulness, mainly via incitement in the basal forebrain. Nicotine withdrawal, after abstaining from nicotine use in non-smokers, was linked with longer overall length of sleep and REM rebound. A 2016 review states that "Although smokers say they smoke to control stress, studies show a significant increase in cortisol concentrations in daily smokers compared with occasional smokers or nonsmokers. These findings suggest that, despite the subjective effects, smoking may actually worsen the negative emotional states. The effects of nicotine on the sleep-wake cycle through nicotine receptors may have a functional significance. Nicotine receptor stimulation promotes wake time and reduces both total sleep time and rapid eye movement sleep."

Nicotine can weaken antibacterial defenses and modify macrophage activation. Nicotine can cause tremors, high blood pressure, abnormal heart rhythms, and lower coronary blood flow. Nicotine constricts blood vessels. This includes coronary blood vessels and those in the skin. However, blood vessels in the skeletal muscle dilate as a result of nicotine. It can also cause nausea, sweating, and diarrhea. In reaction to nitric oxide, it hinders endothelial-dependent widening of blood vessels. It is associated with stroke, peripheral vascular disease, delayed wound healing, peptic ulcer disease, and esophageal reflux. Vapers that get a higher amount of blood nicotine are probably correlated with increased heart rates. Acute administration of nicotine causes a variety of well-characterized, dose- and route-dependent effects in adults, including cardiovascular effects, such as greater cardiac output, leading to an increase in myocardial oxygen demand. Nicotine is correlated with lung inflammation in adults, which may be as a result of it chemotactic effects. Nicotine may have adverse effects on lipids, cause insulin resistance, and may cause pro-inflammatory effects that could impact beta cell function. Nicotine lowers activity of free radical scavenging enzymes, resulting in more production of hydroxyl free radicals. Nicotine impairs glucose homeostasis, indicating a major role in the development of diabetes mellitus type 2. Osseointegration is a pertinent part of the survival of implants. Nicotine considerably impedes the regenerative capability of mesenchymal stem cells. This includes impeding their proliferation, migration, and differentiation. Nicotine has been correlated with vasoconstriction and a weakened ability to heal at the cellular level. Thus, it apparently compromises implant osseointegration. Nicotine lowers estrogen levels and has been associated with early menopause in women. Nicotine is negatively associated with total sperm motility. Nicotine causes dysfunction of NO synthesis. This may result in inability to get penile erections and erectile dysfunction.

A 2016 review found "Evidence from experimental animal models clearly demonstrate nicotine's ability to enhance existing tissue injury and diseases such as cancer, cardiovascular disease, stroke, pancreatitis, peptic ulcer, renal injury and developmental (e.g. pulmonary, reproductive and central nervous system) abnormalities." The consequence of nicotine use in autoimmunity has been conflicting. Nicotine could have cancer-promoting properties, therefore long-term use may not be harmless. Nicotine may result in neuroplasticity variations in the brain. Nicotine has been demonstrated to alter the amounts of brain-derived neurotrophic factor in humans. Nicotine could make cancer therapies less effective. Based on in vitro and in vivo effects of nicotine, patients should be advised not to use nicotine products during cancer treatment unless it is temporarily needed to stop tobacco smoking. Nicotine can suppress appetite. Nicotine users will probably gain weight after using less nicotine. A long-term risk from vaping a base containing nicotine is nicotine dependence.

Youth concerns 

Children are more sensitive to nicotine than adults. The use of products containing nicotine in any form among youth, including in e-cigarettes, is unsafe. Nicotine has more significant and durable damaging effects on adolescent brains compared to adult brains, the former developing more harmful effects. Animal research offers strong evidence that the limbic system is particularly vulnerable to the long lasting effects of nicotine. In youth, nicotine may result in cognitive impairment as well as the chance of nicotine addiction for life. The adolescent's developing brain is especially sensitive to the harmful effects of nicotine. A short period of regular or occasional nicotine exposure in adolescence exerts long-term neurobehavioral damage. Risks of exposing the developing brain to nicotine include mood disorders and permanent lowering of impulse control. The rise in vaping is of great concern because the parts encompassing in greater cognitive activities including the prefrontal cortex of the brain continues to develop into the 20s Nicotine exposure during brain development may hamper growth of neurons and brain circuits, effecting brain architecture, chemistry, and neurobehavioral activity.

Nicotine changes the way synapses are formed, which can harm the parts of the brain that control attention and learning. Preclinical studies indicate that teens being exposed to nicotine interferes with the structural development of the brain, inducing lasting alterations in the brain's neural circuits. Each e-cigarette brand differs in the exact amount of ingredients and nicotine in each product. Therefore, little is known regarding the health consequences of each brand to the growing brains of youth. In August 2014, the American Heart Association noted that "e-cigarettes could fuel and promote nicotine addiction, especially in children." Whether there are subgroups of adolescents who are at greater risk of developing a nicotine dependence from vaping is not known. A 2014 policy statement by the UK's Faculty of Public Health has stated, "A key concern for everyone in public health is that children and young people are being targeted by mass advertising of e-cigarettes. There is a danger that e-cigarettes will lead to young people and non-smokers becoming addicted to nicotine and smoking. Evidence from the US backs up this concern." Long-term studies on the safety of nicotine-only exposure (e.g., as with using e-cigarettes rather than smoking traditional cigarettes) among youth have not been conducted.

In 2015 the psychological and behavioral effects of e-cigarettes were studied using whole-body exposure to e-cigarette vapor, followed by a series of biochemical and behavioral studies. The results showed that nicotine-containing e-cigarette vapor induces addiction-related neurochemical, physiological and behavioral changes. A 2015 study on the offspring of the pregnant mice, which were exposed to nicotine-containing e-cigarette liquid, showed significant behavioral alterations. This indicated that exposure to e-cigarette components in a susceptible time period of brain development could induce persistent behavioral changes. As indicated in the limited research from animal studies, there is the potential for induced changes in neurocognitive growth among children who have been subjected to e-cigarette vapors consisting of nicotine. The FDA stated in 2019 that some people who use e-cigarettes have experienced seizures, with most reports involving youth or young adult users.

Comparison of levels of toxicants in e-cigarette aerosol 

Abbreviations: μg, microgram; ng, nanogram; ND, not detected.

∗Fifteen puffs were chosen to estimate the nicotine delivery of one traditional cigarette.

Effects on breathing and lung function 

The risks to the lungs are not fully understood, and concern exists regarding the negative effects on lung function. The long-term lung function effects of vaping is unknown. There is limited evidence on the long-term health effects to the lungs. The long-term effect from vaping a base containing nicotine on lung tissue is unknown. Limited evidence suggests that e-cigarettes produce less short-term effects on lung function than with traditional cigarettes. Many ingredients used in e-liquids have not been examined in the lung. The effects of e-cigarette use in respect to asthma and other respiratory diseases are unknown. It is not clear whether long-term inhalation of e-cigarette vapor will make asthma better or worse. A 2015 review found e-cigarettes may induce acute lung disease.

Exposure to inhaled nicotine-containing e-cigarette fluids triggered effects normally associated with the development of a chronic obstructive lung disease-like tissue damage in a nicotine-dependent manner. Preclinical research indicate that vaping escalates the virulence of drug resistant microorganisms and diminishes the capacity of lung cells to eliminate bacteria. E-cigarettes have been correlated with pleural effusions. A 2015 study found that e-cigarette vapors can induce oxidative stress in lung endothelial cells. Constant lung inflammation as a result of the e-cigarette vapor could result in lung pathogenesis and induce serious diseases, including chronic obstructive pulmonary disease and fibrosis. There is strong evidence that e-cigarette vapors can result in acute endothelial cell injury, but the long-term effects regarding this matter on being exposed over a prolonged period of time to e-cigarette vapor is uncertain. A 2017 review found "Exposure to nicotine that was specifically generated by the use of e-cigarettes, was shown to promote oxidative stress and impairment of autophagy, which in turn serves as a potential mechanism leading to development of chronic obstructive pulmonary disease." A 2014 case report observed the correlation between sub-acute bronchiolitis and vaping. After quitting vaping the symptoms improved. Vaping causes bronchospasm. Adolescents who vaped had a higher frequency of chronic bronchitis symptoms.

The long-term effects regarding respiratory flow resistance are unknown. The available evidence indicates that e-cigarettes may result in respiratory effects that are like as well as unlike that of traditional cigarettes. E-cigarettes reduce lung function, but to a much lower extent than with traditional cigarettes. E-cigarettes could harm the respiratory system. Vaping induces irritation of the upper and lower respiratory system. The immediate effects of e-cigarettes after 5 minutes of use on pulmonary function resulted in considerable increases in resistance to lung airflow. A 2013 review found an instant increase in airway resistance after using a single e-cigarette. Higher levels of exhaled nitric oxide were found among test subjects in a 2014 study who vaped with a base of nicotine which was associated with lung inflammation. Any reported harmful effects to cardiovascular and respiratory functions after short-term use of e-cigarettes were appreciably milder in comparison to cigarette smoke. When used in the short-term, an e-cigarette resulted in a rise of respiratory resistance comparatively to traditional cigarettes. E-cigarette use could result in respiratory diseases among youth. Evidence from animal studies indicate that children or adolescents exposed to second-hand vapor containing nicotine may impede their lung development. Adolescents with asthma who vape could have greater odds of having a higher number of respiratory symptoms and aggravations in contrast to their peers who do not vape. Adolescents and children with other respiratory ailments who vape may be at greater chance for aggravating of respiratory symptoms. A 2018 PHE report found "There have been some studies with adolescents suggesting respiratory symptoms among EC experimenters. However, small scale or uncontrolled switching studies from smoking to vaping have demonstrated some respiratory improvements." A 2017 review found "among a population of 11th-grade and 12th-grade students in California, e-cigarette use was associated with twice the risk of respiratory symptoms, and the risk increased with more frequent e-cigarette use."

Comparable to a traditional cigarette, e-cigarette particles are tiny enough to enter the alveoli, enabling nicotine absorption. These particles are also tiny enough to go deep in the lungs and enter into the systemic circulation. Research indicates that e‐cigarette vapor containing particulate matter with a diameter of 2.5 μm, just from one puff, enters the systemic circulation via the cardiopulmonary system, leading to a large amount being deposited in the respiratory tract. Local pulmonary toxicity may occur because metal nanoparticles can deposit in the lung's alveolar sacs. E-cigarettes companies state that the particulates produced by an e-cigarette are too tiny to be deposited in the alveoli. Tinier particles deposit more nicotine in the alveoli. Different devices generate different particle sizes and cause different depositions in the respiratory tract, even from the same nicotine liquid. The aerosol production of e-cigarettes during vaping decreases, which requires a more forceful suction to create a similar volume of aerosol. A more forceful suction could affect the deposition of substances into the lungs. Reports in the literature have shown respiratory and cardiovascular effects by these smaller size particles, suggesting a possible health concern. Vaping is potentially harmful, especially to the critically ill, such as people with oncologic, lung, or cardiac diseases. A 2019 case study of hard-metal pneumoconiosis was published in the European Respiratory Journal. Researchers tested the patient's e-cigarette, which was used with cannabis. Cobalt was found in the vapor, including other toxic metals-nickel, aluminum, manganese, lead, and chromium. Metal-induced toxicity in the lung can result in long-term, if not, permanent scarring of the lungs.

As with cardiovascular disease, evidence consistently indicates that exposure to e-cigarette aerosol has adverse effects on lungs and pulmonary function. Repeated exposure to acrolein, which is produced by heating the propylene glycol and glycerin in e-liquids, causes chronic pulmonary inflammation, reduction of host defense, neutrophil inflammation, mucus hypersecretion, and protease-mediated lung tissue damage, which are linked to the development of chronic obstructive pulmonary disease. E-cigarette aerosol also exposes users to highly oxidizing free radicals. The chemical characteristics of the short-lived free radicals and long-lived free radicals produced from e-cigarettes is unclear.  Animal studies have also shown that e-cigarettes increase pulmonary inflammation and oxidative stress while inhibiting the immune system.

Consistent with these experimental results, people who used e-cigarettes experienced decreased expression of immune-related genes in their nasal cavities, with more genes suppressed than among cigarette smokers, indicating immune suppression in the nasal mucosa. E-cigarette use upregulates expression of platelet-activating factor receptor (PAFR) in users' nasal epithelial cells; PAFR is an important molecule involved in the ability of S.pneumoniae, the leading cause of bacterial pneumonia, to attach to cells it infects (adherence). In light of the immunosuppressive effects observed in nasal mucosa, there is concern that e-cigarette use will predispose users toward more severe respiratory infections, as has been demonstrated in mouse studies.

Given these effects, it is not surprising that e-cigarette use is associated with a doubling of the risk of symptoms of chronic bronchitis among US high school juniors and seniors with higher risk associated with higher use; these risks persisted among former users. Similarly, current e-cigarette use was associated with an increased diagnosis of asthma among Korean high school students among current (e-cigarette users who were never cigarette smokers). E-cigarette users were also more likely to have had days absent from school due to severe asthma symptoms.

Vaping is reportedly tied to a range of lung injuries which include hypersensitivity pneumonitis (HP), diffuse alveolar hemorrhage (DAH), acute eosinophilic pneumonia (AEP), diffuse alveolar damage, organizing pneumonia (OP), lipoid pneumonia, and giant cell interstitial pneumonia (GIP).

2019–2020 vaping lung injury outbreak 

Since 2019, an ongoing outbreak of severe vaping-associated lung illness has affected certain users of vaping products in the United States. Cases involved in the outbreak of lung illness were first identified in Illinois and Wisconsin in April 2019. Similar cases of vaping-associated lung illness were reported in the UK and Japan before the outbreak occurred. As of January 21, 2020, a total of 2,711 hospitalized cases have been reported to the Centers for Disease Control and Prevention (CDC) from all 50 states, the District of Columbia, and two US territories (Puerto Rico and US Virgin Islands). 60 deaths have been confirmed in 27 states and the District of Columbia in the US, as of January 21, 2020. Based on reports from several states, symptoms typically develop over a period of days but sometimes can manifest over several weeks. The outbreak mainly affected young people, which is the group with the greatest prevalence of cannabis use in the US. The ubiquitous use of e-cigarettes including products that enable THC use likely contributed to the outbreak.

On September 6, 2019, Dr. Dana Meaney-Delman, serving as the incident manager of the Centers for Disease Control and Prevention's (CDC) response to this outbreak, said that "Based on the clinical and laboratory evidence to date, we believe that a chemical exposure is likely associated with these illnesses." Of the 2,506 reported cases, information is available in the three months prior to symptom onset for 1,782 of them as of December 3, 2019. 80% reported THC use, 35% reported exclusive THC use, about 54% reported using nicotine-containing products, and 13% reported exclusive use of nicotine-containing products. Many of the samples tested by the states or by the US Food and Drug Administration (US FDA) as part of the 2019 investigation have been identified as vaping products containing tetrahydrocannabinol (or THC, a psychoactive component of the cannabis plant). Most of those samples with THC tested also contained significant amounts of vitamin E acetate. A case-control study found vitamin E acetate in the brochoalveolar lavage fluid of 94% of 51 EVALI patients and in none in 99 healthy controls in the comparator group. The CDC reported that their findings suggest vaping products containing THC are linked to most of the cases and play a major role in the outbreak. The CDC stated that the chemical vitamin E acetate is a very strong culprit of concern in the lung illnesses related to THC-based vaping products, but did not rule out other chemicals as possible causes.

Thickening agents were used to dilute vape oils. There has been an increase in attention to companies that sell diluent products that are made with vitamin E acetate. Previously, vitamin E was used in low concentrations, or lower than 20% of the formula in vape cartridges. As a result of a limited availability of cannabis in California as well as high demand, illicit sellers had used about 50% or higher of diluent thickeners in their formulas to bulk up tiny potency vape cartridges. In September 2019, New York Governor Andrew Cuomo instructed the state health department to issue subpoenas against three sellers of thickening agents used in illicit vaping products.

The e-cigarette industry is placing the blame on illicit vaping liquids for the lung injuries. Juul Labs stated that some news reports state that several cases of lung illness are associated with vaping THC, found in cannabis, "a Schedule 1, controlled substance that we do not sell." The CDC recommends that the public should consider not using any vaping products during their investigation, particularly those containing THC from informal sources like friends, or family, or in-person or online dealers as of November 20, 2019. The US FDA considers it prudent to avoid inhaling vitamin E acetate. On September 6, 2019, the US FDA stated that because consumers cannot be sure whether any THC vaping products may contain vitamin E acetate, consumers are urged to avoid buying vaping products on the street, and to refrain from using THC oil or modifying/adding any substances to products purchased in stores.

Cardiovascular effects 
There is limited available evidence on their long-term cardiovascular effects. No data is available on their effects in individuals with cardiovascular disease, as of 2016. Their cardiovascular effects in individuals who do not have cardiovascular disease is uncertain. Although limited, there is supportive evidence that vaping adversely impacts endothelial function and arterial hardening. Most of the cardiovascular effects of vaping are consistent with those of nicotine. Vaping might bring about some adverse cardiovascular effects to users, especially those who already have cardiovascular disease. However, the risk is believed to be lower than that of cigarette smoking based on research comparing e-cigarette aerosol in contrast to cigarette smoke chemicals. The effects of aldehydes, particulates, and flavorings used in vaping devices on cardiovascular health is not clear. Low amounts of aldehydes can still be a health concern, particularly among individuals with cardiovascular disease. E-cigarettes reduce cardiac muscle function and increase inflammation, but these changes were only substantial with traditional cigarettes. No published research is available on vaping and thrombosis, platelet reactivity, atherosclerosis, or blood vessel function. The small particles generated from e-cigarette use have the ability to get through airways and enter circulation, which pose a potential risk to cardiovascular systems. The minute nicotine particles in the e-cigarette vapor could increase the risk of cardiac arrhythmias and hypertension which may put some users, particularly those with atherosclerosis or other cardiovascular risk factors, at significant risk of acute coronary syndrome. There are many compounds in the e-cigarette vapor that have an impact on the onset and advancement of atherosclerosis. Some case reports documented the possible cardiovascular adverse effects from using e-cigarettes, the majority associated was with improper use. Even though e-cigarettes are anticipated to produce fewer harmful substances than traditional cigarettes, limited evidence recognizes they comparatively have a lowered raised cardiovascular risk.

Preliminary studies have shown that using a nicotine containing e-cigarette for just five minutes causes similar lung irritation, inflammation, and effect on blood vessels as smoking a traditional cigarette, which may increase the risk of a heart attack. E-cigarette use leads to sympathomimetic effects because of nicotine intake. It is argued that there could be a risk for harmful effects, including tachycardia-induced cardiomyopathy. E-cigarettes containing nicotine may have a lower cardiovascular effect than traditional cigarettes containing nicotine. Research on the consequences of vaping on blood pressure is limited. Short-term physiological effects include increases in blood pressure and heart rate. The increased blood pressure and heart rate among smokers who vaped was lower than with cigarette smoking. A 2016 study found vaping increases aortic stiffness in people who did not have cardiovascular risk factors, an effect that was lower than with cigarette smoking. Habitual vaping was associated with oxidative stress and a shift towards cardiac sympathetic activity, which are both associated with a risk of developing cardiovascular disease. A 2012 case report found a correlation between paroxysmal atrial fibrillation and vaping. Research indicates a relationship between exposure to particulate matter with a diameter of 2.5 μm and the chance of developing cardiovascular disease.

E-cigarettes adversely impact the cardiovascular system. Although the specific role of nicotine in cardiovascular disease remains debated, nicotine is not the only biologically active component in e-cigarette aerosol. E-cigarettes work by creating an aerosol of ultrafine particles to carry nicotine deep into the lungs. These particles are as small as—and sometimes smaller than—those in traditional cigarettes. These ultra fine particles are themselves biologically active, trigger inflammatory processes, and are directly implicated in causing cardiovascular disease and acute cardiovascular events. The dose-response effect for exposure to particles is nonlinear, with substantial increases in cardiovascular risk with even low levels of exposure to ultrafine particles. For example, exposure to second-hand cigarette smoke has nearly as large an effect on many risk factors for cardiovascular disease and the risk of acute myocardial infarction as does being an active smoker. Like traditional cigarette smokers, e-cigarette users experience increased oxidative stress and increases in the release of inflammatory mediators. E-cigarette aerosol also induces platelet activation, aggregation, and adhesion. All these changes are associated with an increased risk of cardiovascular disease. These physiological changes are manifest in rapid deterioration of vascular function following use of e-cigarettes. E-cigarette and traditional cigarette smoking in healthy individuals with no known cardiovascular disease exhibit similar inhibition of the ability of arteries to dilate in response to the need for more blood flow. This change reflects damage to the lining of the arteries (the vascular endothelium), which increases both the risk of long-term heart disease and an acute event such as a myocardial infarction (heart attack). Using e-cigarettes is also accompanied by a shift in balance of the autonomic (reflex) nervous system toward sympathetic predominance, which is also associated with increased cardiac risk. Daily e-cigarette use is correlated with an increased risk of a heart attack (myocardial infarction) in health surveys.

There is little evidence indicating that using e-cigarettes rather than continue to smoke will help periodontal disease. Vaping with or without nicotine or flavoring may help cause periodontal disease. Nicotine as well as their flavoring may be damaging to periodontal ligament, stem cells, and gingival fibroblasts in cultures as a result of creation of aldehydes and/or carbonyls from e-cigarette vapor. It is possible that e-cigarettes could harm the periodontium because of the effects of nicotine on gum tissues and the immune system. Vaping resulted in nicotine stomatitis, hairy tongue, and angular cheilitis. Vaping can cause oral mucosal lesions. No compelling evidence from vaping indicates it directly causes oral cancer.

Other effects 

Vaping long-term is anticipated to raise the risk of developing some of the diseases linked to smoking. There were reports of e-cigarettes causing an immune system reaction involving inflammation of the gastrointestinal system.   Some health effects associated with e-cigarette use can include recurring ulcerative colitis, lipoid pneumonia, acute eosinophilic pneumonitis, sub-acute bronchial toxicity, reversible cerebral vasoconstriction syndrome, and reversal of chronic idiopathic neutrophilia. A 2016 study regarding e-liquid exposure in adults rats showed e-cigarettes have an adverse impact on the kidneys. Vaping can cause contact dermatitis and thermal injuries.

E-cigarettes and pregnancy 
It is discouraged for pregnant and breastfeeding females to substitute cigarettes with e-cigarettes. It is recommended that females who smoke during pregnancy to quit using cigarettes. Current guidelines state that nicotine products (such as patches, gum and mouth spray) can help. Research from the UK suggests that pregnant women could also consider e-cigarettes. There is concern for breastfeeding females using e-cigarettes, due to the lack of data on propylene glycol transferring to breastmilk. Nicotine could also impact the development of the infant since it is a teratogen. It is discouraged to use e-cigarettes while breastfeeding infants or young children. The consequences of vaping on infants feeding on breast milk is uncertain.

Public perceptions
Marketing and advertisement play a significant role in the public's perception of e-cigarettes. Some tobacco users think vaping is safer than tobacco or other smoking cessation aids. It is generally considered by users that e-cigarettes are safer than tobacco. Emerging research indicates that vaping is not as safe as previously thought. Many users think that e-cigarettes are healthier than traditional cigarettes for personal use or for other people. Many youth believe vaping is a safe substitute to traditional cigarettes. A 2016 review suggests "that the perceived health risks, specific product characteristics (such as taste, price and inconspicuous use), and higher levels of acceptance among peers and others potentially make e-cigarettes initially more attractive to adolescents than tobacco cigarettes. Youths who have lower harm perceptions may be particularly susceptible to e-cigarette and polytobacco use, conversely those who perceive e-cigarettes as more harmful would be less likely to use them. Usually, only a small proportion of users are concerned about the potential adverse health effects or toxicity of e-cigarettes. A nation-wide US survey among adults found 11.1% thought vaping during pregnancy was not as harmful as smoking, 51.0% thought it was as harmful, 11.6% thought it would be an increased harm, and 26.2% were unsure. A 2015 study showed that 60% of all adolescence stated vaping were safe or a minor health risk and that 53.4% considered vaping safer than cigarette smoking. A 2017 review found, based on literature from January 2006 to October 2016, examining perceptions regarding vaping during pregnancy, that the majority of respondents perceived vaping can carry health risks to mother and child, but also thought they may be less harmful than traditional cigarettes. Many adolescent asthmatics have a favorable view of vaping. A 2016 survey of people 14 years of age and up in Germany reported that 20.7% of participants consider e-cigarettes to be not as harmful as cigarettes, 46.3% just as harmful, and 16.1% thought they were more harmful, and 17.0% gave no answer. In terms of harm perception, a 2016 study found that flavored e-cigarette use reduced the prevalence of perception of the dangers of tobacco use among youth. Another 2016 study found more nuanced results, demonstrating that tobacco flavor increased harm perception while fruit and sweet flavors decreased harm perception among UK adolescents. Similarly, a 2016 study in the US found that, for US adolescents, fruit-flavored e-cigarettes were perceived to be less harmful than tobacco flavored ones. There is indication that an individual's perception of a substance's potential harms and benefits and their behavior of use is influenced by the availability of information discussing the health effects of that substance. A 2015 analysis reports that 34.20% (8433/24,658) of American youth sampled believe that e-cigarettes are less harmful than cigarettes, and 45% (11,096/24,658) are not sure.

, under 50% of adults in the UK believe vaping is less harmful than smoking. Action on Smoking and Health (ASH) in the UK found that in 2015, compared to the year before, "there has been a growing false belief that electronic cigarettes could be as harmful as smoking". Among smokers who had heard of e-cigarettes but never tried them, this "perception of harm has nearly doubled from 12% in 2014 to 22% in 2015." ASH expressed concern that "The growth of this false perception risks discouraging many smokers from using electronic cigarettes to quit and keep them smoking instead which would be bad for their health and the health of those around them." A 2015 PHE report noted that in the US belief among respondents to a survey that vaping was safer than smoking cigarettes fell from 82% in 2010 to 51% in 2014. The report blamed "misinterpreted research findings", attracting negative media coverage, for the growth in the "inaccurate" belief that e-cigarettes were as harmful as smoking. A 2017 review noted that there is a public misconception that vaping is safer than cigarette smoking. A 2016 review noted that the increasing use of e-cigarettes may be due in part to "the misperception that e-cigarettes are a safer alternative to traditional cigarettes." A 2014 review noted that "users do not appear to fully understand their health risks." Beliefs on vaping may be surpassing our scientific knowledge of these products. Proponents of vaping have stated that nicotine is 'as safe as caffeine'. E-cigarettes are believed to be considerably safer compared with smoking and nicotine is thought to be comparatively harmless. As a consequence, it is believed to be without risk to use them indoors or near babies.

A 2014 worldwide survey found that 88% of respondents stated that vaping were less harmful than cigarette smoke and 11% believed that vaping were absolutely harmless. A 2013 four-country survey found higher than 75% of current and former smokers think e-cigarettes are safer than traditional cigarettes. A 2017 report found that among high income countries, Republic of Korea in 2016 was 66%, the US in 2016 was 37%, Netherlands in 2015 was 32%, Canada in 2016 was 30%, the UK in 2016 was 24%, Australia in 2016 was 22%, Uruguay in 2014 was 19%, and among low income countries, Malaysia in 2013 was 70%, Zambia in 2014 was 57%, Thailand in 2012 was 54%, Mexico from 2014 to 2015 was 38%, Bangladesh from 2014 to 2015 was 37%, Brazil from 2012 to 2013 was 22%, and China from 2013 to 2015 was 15%, for the percentage of respondents of adult smokers believing e-cigarette use is just as risky or more risky to health than cigarettes.

A 2016 review found that "The vaping communities' apparent lack of acknowledgment of the potential negative impacts of e-cigarettes appears to have discredited them in the eyes of many public health officials. Continuing down this path may generate beliefs that the vaping community cares little for public health, are primarily interested in selling their fast-growing companies to the highest tobacco company bidder, and will oppose any meaningful regulations of their product, however reasonable and necessary they may be—essentially aligning the vaping community's practices to tobacco companies' well-established playbook." A 2017 review found that "Although it was originally argued that e‐cigarettes are 'harm free,' the present prevailing belief is that they are 'reduced harm' alternatives to conventional cigarettes. This latter notion is still debatable and not supported by conclusive evidence, especially considering the wide variation between e‐cigarette products." E-cigarette advertisements with warnings could strengthen e-cigarette harm perceptions, and lower the likelihood of buying e-cigarettes.

Gallery

See also 
Health effects of tobacco
 Regulation of electronic cigarettes
 Positions of medical organizations on electronic cigarettes

Notes

Bibliography

References

External links 
 

Electronic cigarettes
Electronic cigarettes